

462001–462100 

|-bgcolor=#E9E9E9
| 462001 ||  || — || November 21, 2006 || Mount Lemmon || Mount Lemmon Survey || — || align=right data-sort-value="0.84" | 840 m || 
|-id=002 bgcolor=#E9E9E9
| 462002 ||  || — || November 15, 2006 || Kitt Peak || Spacewatch || — || align=right data-sort-value="0.79" | 790 m || 
|-id=003 bgcolor=#E9E9E9
| 462003 ||  || — || October 21, 2006 || Mount Lemmon || Mount Lemmon Survey || — || align=right data-sort-value="0.99" | 990 m || 
|-id=004 bgcolor=#E9E9E9
| 462004 ||  || — || November 15, 2006 || Kitt Peak || Spacewatch || — || align=right data-sort-value="0.99" | 990 m || 
|-id=005 bgcolor=#E9E9E9
| 462005 ||  || — || November 11, 2006 || Kitt Peak || Spacewatch || — || align=right data-sort-value="0.75" | 750 m || 
|-id=006 bgcolor=#E9E9E9
| 462006 ||  || — || November 24, 2006 || Mount Lemmon || Mount Lemmon Survey || — || align=right | 1.1 km || 
|-id=007 bgcolor=#E9E9E9
| 462007 ||  || — || November 24, 2006 || Kitt Peak || Spacewatch || — || align=right | 1.1 km || 
|-id=008 bgcolor=#E9E9E9
| 462008 ||  || — || December 9, 2006 || Kitt Peak || Spacewatch || — || align=right data-sort-value="0.88" | 880 m || 
|-id=009 bgcolor=#E9E9E9
| 462009 ||  || — || December 9, 2006 || Palomar || NEAT || — || align=right | 1.2 km || 
|-id=010 bgcolor=#E9E9E9
| 462010 ||  || — || December 10, 2006 || Kitt Peak || Spacewatch || — || align=right | 1.1 km || 
|-id=011 bgcolor=#fefefe
| 462011 ||  || — || October 27, 2006 || Kitt Peak || Spacewatch || — || align=right data-sort-value="0.85" | 850 m || 
|-id=012 bgcolor=#d6d6d6
| 462012 ||  || — || December 11, 2006 || Kitt Peak || Spacewatch || 3:2 || align=right | 4.1 km || 
|-id=013 bgcolor=#E9E9E9
| 462013 ||  || — || November 27, 2006 || Kitt Peak || Spacewatch || ADE || align=right | 1.4 km || 
|-id=014 bgcolor=#E9E9E9
| 462014 ||  || — || November 16, 2006 || Mount Lemmon || Mount Lemmon Survey || EUN || align=right | 1.0 km || 
|-id=015 bgcolor=#E9E9E9
| 462015 ||  || — || December 12, 2006 || Palomar || NEAT || — || align=right | 1.7 km || 
|-id=016 bgcolor=#E9E9E9
| 462016 ||  || — || November 17, 2006 || Kitt Peak || Spacewatch || — || align=right | 1.4 km || 
|-id=017 bgcolor=#E9E9E9
| 462017 ||  || — || December 14, 2006 || Mount Lemmon || Mount Lemmon Survey || — || align=right | 1.0 km || 
|-id=018 bgcolor=#E9E9E9
| 462018 ||  || — || September 21, 2001 || Kitt Peak || Spacewatch || — || align=right | 1.5 km || 
|-id=019 bgcolor=#E9E9E9
| 462019 ||  || — || December 14, 2006 || Kitt Peak || Spacewatch || — || align=right | 1.6 km || 
|-id=020 bgcolor=#E9E9E9
| 462020 ||  || — || December 27, 2006 || Kitt Peak || Spacewatch || — || align=right data-sort-value="0.96" | 960 m || 
|-id=021 bgcolor=#E9E9E9
| 462021 ||  || — || December 17, 2006 || Mount Lemmon || Mount Lemmon Survey || — || align=right | 1.2 km || 
|-id=022 bgcolor=#E9E9E9
| 462022 ||  || — || December 26, 2006 || Kitt Peak || Spacewatch || — || align=right | 2.3 km || 
|-id=023 bgcolor=#E9E9E9
| 462023 ||  || — || November 25, 2006 || Mount Lemmon || Mount Lemmon Survey || — || align=right | 1.4 km || 
|-id=024 bgcolor=#E9E9E9
| 462024 ||  || — || January 17, 2007 || Palomar || NEAT || — || align=right | 1.8 km || 
|-id=025 bgcolor=#E9E9E9
| 462025 ||  || — || November 18, 2006 || Mount Lemmon || Mount Lemmon Survey || — || align=right | 1.5 km || 
|-id=026 bgcolor=#E9E9E9
| 462026 ||  || — || September 1, 2005 || Kitt Peak || Spacewatch || — || align=right | 1.4 km || 
|-id=027 bgcolor=#E9E9E9
| 462027 ||  || — || September 30, 2005 || Kitt Peak || Spacewatch || — || align=right | 2.1 km || 
|-id=028 bgcolor=#E9E9E9
| 462028 ||  || — || December 13, 2006 || Mount Lemmon || Mount Lemmon Survey || BRG || align=right | 1.5 km || 
|-id=029 bgcolor=#E9E9E9
| 462029 ||  || — || January 17, 2007 || Kitt Peak || Spacewatch || — || align=right | 1.2 km || 
|-id=030 bgcolor=#E9E9E9
| 462030 ||  || — || January 27, 2007 || Mount Lemmon || Mount Lemmon Survey || — || align=right | 1.4 km || 
|-id=031 bgcolor=#E9E9E9
| 462031 ||  || — || January 25, 2007 || Catalina || CSS || — || align=right | 1.4 km || 
|-id=032 bgcolor=#E9E9E9
| 462032 ||  || — || January 27, 2007 || Mount Lemmon || Mount Lemmon Survey || — || align=right | 1.5 km || 
|-id=033 bgcolor=#E9E9E9
| 462033 ||  || — || February 7, 2007 || Mount Lemmon || Mount Lemmon Survey || EUN || align=right | 1.5 km || 
|-id=034 bgcolor=#E9E9E9
| 462034 ||  || — || February 6, 2007 || Palomar || NEAT || — || align=right | 1.6 km || 
|-id=035 bgcolor=#E9E9E9
| 462035 ||  || — || January 27, 2007 || Kitt Peak || Spacewatch || — || align=right | 2.9 km || 
|-id=036 bgcolor=#E9E9E9
| 462036 ||  || — || January 27, 2007 || Mount Lemmon || Mount Lemmon Survey || — || align=right | 1.4 km || 
|-id=037 bgcolor=#E9E9E9
| 462037 ||  || — || February 10, 2007 || Catalina || CSS || — || align=right | 1.6 km || 
|-id=038 bgcolor=#E9E9E9
| 462038 ||  || — || January 15, 2007 || Catalina || CSS || — || align=right | 1.7 km || 
|-id=039 bgcolor=#E9E9E9
| 462039 ||  || — || February 13, 2007 || Socorro || LINEAR || — || align=right | 2.4 km || 
|-id=040 bgcolor=#E9E9E9
| 462040 ||  || — || February 16, 2007 || Catalina || CSS || — || align=right | 1.2 km || 
|-id=041 bgcolor=#FFC2E0
| 462041 ||  || — || February 21, 2007 || Mount Lemmon || Mount Lemmon Survey || APO +1km || align=right | 1.8 km || 
|-id=042 bgcolor=#E9E9E9
| 462042 ||  || — || February 17, 2007 || Kitt Peak || Spacewatch || — || align=right | 2.2 km || 
|-id=043 bgcolor=#E9E9E9
| 462043 ||  || — || February 17, 2007 || Kitt Peak || Spacewatch || — || align=right | 2.3 km || 
|-id=044 bgcolor=#E9E9E9
| 462044 ||  || — || February 17, 2007 || Kitt Peak || Spacewatch || — || align=right | 1.3 km || 
|-id=045 bgcolor=#E9E9E9
| 462045 ||  || — || December 27, 2006 || Mount Lemmon || Mount Lemmon Survey || — || align=right | 1.8 km || 
|-id=046 bgcolor=#E9E9E9
| 462046 ||  || — || February 21, 2007 || Mount Lemmon || Mount Lemmon Survey || — || align=right | 1.5 km || 
|-id=047 bgcolor=#E9E9E9
| 462047 ||  || — || February 23, 2007 || Kitt Peak || Spacewatch || — || align=right | 1.5 km || 
|-id=048 bgcolor=#E9E9E9
| 462048 ||  || — || February 25, 2007 || Kitt Peak || Spacewatch || — || align=right | 2.3 km || 
|-id=049 bgcolor=#E9E9E9
| 462049 ||  || — || February 25, 2007 || Mount Lemmon || Mount Lemmon Survey || — || align=right | 2.4 km || 
|-id=050 bgcolor=#E9E9E9
| 462050 ||  || — || January 28, 2007 || Kitt Peak || Spacewatch || — || align=right | 2.0 km || 
|-id=051 bgcolor=#E9E9E9
| 462051 ||  || — || March 9, 2007 || Mount Lemmon || Mount Lemmon Survey || — || align=right | 1.3 km || 
|-id=052 bgcolor=#E9E9E9
| 462052 ||  || — || February 8, 2007 || Mount Lemmon || Mount Lemmon Survey || — || align=right | 1.2 km || 
|-id=053 bgcolor=#E9E9E9
| 462053 ||  || — || March 10, 2007 || Kitt Peak || Spacewatch || — || align=right | 1.5 km || 
|-id=054 bgcolor=#E9E9E9
| 462054 ||  || — || February 23, 2007 || Mount Lemmon || Mount Lemmon Survey || — || align=right | 1.5 km || 
|-id=055 bgcolor=#E9E9E9
| 462055 ||  || — || March 12, 2007 || Kleť || Kleť Obs. || EUN || align=right | 1.2 km || 
|-id=056 bgcolor=#E9E9E9
| 462056 ||  || — || March 9, 2007 || Mount Lemmon || Mount Lemmon Survey || — || align=right | 1.8 km || 
|-id=057 bgcolor=#E9E9E9
| 462057 ||  || — || January 8, 2002 || Socorro || LINEAR || MRX || align=right | 1.1 km || 
|-id=058 bgcolor=#E9E9E9
| 462058 ||  || — || February 21, 2007 || Kitt Peak || Spacewatch || — || align=right | 1.9 km || 
|-id=059 bgcolor=#E9E9E9
| 462059 ||  || — || February 25, 2007 || Kitt Peak || Spacewatch || — || align=right | 2.9 km || 
|-id=060 bgcolor=#E9E9E9
| 462060 ||  || — || March 10, 2007 || Mount Lemmon || Mount Lemmon Survey || EUN || align=right | 1.2 km || 
|-id=061 bgcolor=#E9E9E9
| 462061 ||  || — || January 17, 2007 || Kitt Peak || Spacewatch || — || align=right | 1.1 km || 
|-id=062 bgcolor=#E9E9E9
| 462062 ||  || — || March 12, 2007 || Kitt Peak || Spacewatch || MRX || align=right data-sort-value="0.92" | 920 m || 
|-id=063 bgcolor=#E9E9E9
| 462063 ||  || — || February 23, 2007 || Mount Lemmon || Mount Lemmon Survey || — || align=right | 1.8 km || 
|-id=064 bgcolor=#E9E9E9
| 462064 ||  || — || March 11, 2007 || Kitt Peak || Spacewatch || — || align=right | 2.3 km || 
|-id=065 bgcolor=#E9E9E9
| 462065 ||  || — || February 23, 2007 || Mount Lemmon || Mount Lemmon Survey || — || align=right | 1.3 km || 
|-id=066 bgcolor=#E9E9E9
| 462066 ||  || — || March 14, 2007 || Mount Lemmon || Mount Lemmon Survey || JUN || align=right | 1.5 km || 
|-id=067 bgcolor=#E9E9E9
| 462067 ||  || — || February 26, 2007 || Mount Lemmon || Mount Lemmon Survey || JUN || align=right | 1.2 km || 
|-id=068 bgcolor=#E9E9E9
| 462068 ||  || — || March 9, 2007 || Kitt Peak || Spacewatch || — || align=right | 2.7 km || 
|-id=069 bgcolor=#E9E9E9
| 462069 ||  || — || March 10, 2007 || Mount Lemmon || Mount Lemmon Survey || GEF || align=right | 1.0 km || 
|-id=070 bgcolor=#E9E9E9
| 462070 ||  || — || March 12, 2007 || Kitt Peak || Spacewatch || — || align=right | 1.3 km || 
|-id=071 bgcolor=#E9E9E9
| 462071 ||  || — || March 12, 2007 || Kitt Peak || Spacewatch || HOF || align=right | 2.2 km || 
|-id=072 bgcolor=#E9E9E9
| 462072 ||  || — || March 12, 2007 || Mount Lemmon || Mount Lemmon Survey || — || align=right | 1.8 km || 
|-id=073 bgcolor=#E9E9E9
| 462073 ||  || — || March 13, 2007 || Mount Lemmon || Mount Lemmon Survey || — || align=right | 1.6 km || 
|-id=074 bgcolor=#E9E9E9
| 462074 ||  || — || March 9, 2007 || Mount Lemmon || Mount Lemmon Survey || AGN || align=right | 1.1 km || 
|-id=075 bgcolor=#E9E9E9
| 462075 ||  || — || March 9, 2007 || Mount Lemmon || Mount Lemmon Survey || — || align=right | 2.1 km || 
|-id=076 bgcolor=#E9E9E9
| 462076 ||  || — || March 13, 2007 || Kitt Peak || Spacewatch || — || align=right | 1.9 km || 
|-id=077 bgcolor=#E9E9E9
| 462077 ||  || — || March 12, 2007 || Kitt Peak || Spacewatch || — || align=right | 2.2 km || 
|-id=078 bgcolor=#E9E9E9
| 462078 ||  || — || March 18, 2007 || Pla D'Arguines || R. Ferrando || DOR || align=right | 2.1 km || 
|-id=079 bgcolor=#E9E9E9
| 462079 ||  || — || March 20, 2007 || Mount Lemmon || Mount Lemmon Survey || — || align=right | 1.3 km || 
|-id=080 bgcolor=#E9E9E9
| 462080 ||  || — || March 20, 2007 || Kitt Peak || Spacewatch || NEM || align=right | 2.0 km || 
|-id=081 bgcolor=#E9E9E9
| 462081 ||  || — || March 9, 2007 || Kitt Peak || Spacewatch || — || align=right | 1.5 km || 
|-id=082 bgcolor=#E9E9E9
| 462082 ||  || — || March 17, 2007 || Anderson Mesa || LONEOS || — || align=right | 1.6 km || 
|-id=083 bgcolor=#E9E9E9
| 462083 ||  || — || March 16, 2007 || Mount Lemmon || Mount Lemmon Survey || NEM || align=right | 1.6 km || 
|-id=084 bgcolor=#E9E9E9
| 462084 ||  || — || March 15, 2007 || Kitt Peak || Spacewatch || — || align=right | 1.9 km || 
|-id=085 bgcolor=#C2FFFF
| 462085 ||  || — || March 11, 2007 || Mount Lemmon || Mount Lemmon Survey || L5 || align=right | 12 km || 
|-id=086 bgcolor=#E9E9E9
| 462086 ||  || — || April 11, 2007 || Mount Lemmon || Mount Lemmon Survey || — || align=right | 1.8 km || 
|-id=087 bgcolor=#E9E9E9
| 462087 ||  || — || September 24, 2000 || Socorro || LINEAR || — || align=right | 1.7 km || 
|-id=088 bgcolor=#E9E9E9
| 462088 ||  || — || April 14, 2007 || Mount Lemmon || Mount Lemmon Survey || — || align=right | 2.0 km || 
|-id=089 bgcolor=#E9E9E9
| 462089 ||  || — || April 14, 2007 || Kitt Peak || Spacewatch || DOR || align=right | 2.3 km || 
|-id=090 bgcolor=#E9E9E9
| 462090 ||  || — || March 13, 2007 || Kitt Peak || Spacewatch || — || align=right | 2.0 km || 
|-id=091 bgcolor=#E9E9E9
| 462091 ||  || — || March 13, 2007 || Mount Lemmon || Mount Lemmon Survey || — || align=right | 2.6 km || 
|-id=092 bgcolor=#d6d6d6
| 462092 ||  || — || April 18, 2007 || Kitt Peak || Spacewatch || — || align=right | 1.9 km || 
|-id=093 bgcolor=#E9E9E9
| 462093 ||  || — || April 19, 2007 || Kitt Peak || Spacewatch || DOR || align=right | 2.2 km || 
|-id=094 bgcolor=#E9E9E9
| 462094 ||  || — || April 22, 2007 || Mount Lemmon || Mount Lemmon Survey || — || align=right | 2.0 km || 
|-id=095 bgcolor=#E9E9E9
| 462095 ||  || — || April 19, 2007 || Mount Lemmon || Mount Lemmon Survey || — || align=right | 3.1 km || 
|-id=096 bgcolor=#E9E9E9
| 462096 ||  || — || May 7, 2007 || Kitt Peak || Spacewatch || — || align=right | 1.4 km || 
|-id=097 bgcolor=#FA8072
| 462097 ||  || — || May 16, 2007 || Catalina || CSS || — || align=right | 2.5 km || 
|-id=098 bgcolor=#E9E9E9
| 462098 ||  || — || June 15, 2007 || Kitt Peak || Spacewatch || — || align=right | 1.9 km || 
|-id=099 bgcolor=#E9E9E9
| 462099 ||  || — || June 18, 2007 || Kitt Peak || Spacewatch || — || align=right | 2.9 km || 
|-id=100 bgcolor=#fefefe
| 462100 ||  || — || June 15, 2007 || Kitt Peak || Spacewatch || — || align=right data-sort-value="0.67" | 670 m || 
|}

462101–462200 

|-bgcolor=#fefefe
| 462101 ||  || — || August 9, 2007 || Socorro || LINEAR || — || align=right data-sort-value="0.77" | 770 m || 
|-id=102 bgcolor=#FA8072
| 462102 ||  || — || August 12, 2007 || Socorro || LINEAR || — || align=right data-sort-value="0.80" | 800 m || 
|-id=103 bgcolor=#d6d6d6
| 462103 ||  || — || August 9, 2007 || Socorro || LINEAR || — || align=right | 2.5 km || 
|-id=104 bgcolor=#d6d6d6
| 462104 ||  || — || August 18, 2007 || Bergisch Gladbach || W. Bickel || — || align=right | 2.8 km || 
|-id=105 bgcolor=#fefefe
| 462105 ||  || — || August 18, 2007 || XuYi || PMO NEO || — || align=right data-sort-value="0.70" | 700 m || 
|-id=106 bgcolor=#d6d6d6
| 462106 ||  || — || September 5, 2007 || Siding Spring || K. Sárneczky, L. Kiss || — || align=right | 3.1 km || 
|-id=107 bgcolor=#FA8072
| 462107 ||  || — || September 11, 2007 || Catalina || CSS || — || align=right | 1.3 km || 
|-id=108 bgcolor=#fefefe
| 462108 ||  || — || September 3, 2007 || Catalina || CSS || (2076) || align=right data-sort-value="0.81" | 810 m || 
|-id=109 bgcolor=#fefefe
| 462109 ||  || — || September 5, 2007 || Mount Lemmon || Mount Lemmon Survey || — || align=right data-sort-value="0.65" | 650 m || 
|-id=110 bgcolor=#fefefe
| 462110 ||  || — || September 8, 2007 || Anderson Mesa || LONEOS || — || align=right data-sort-value="0.99" | 990 m || 
|-id=111 bgcolor=#fefefe
| 462111 ||  || — || September 9, 2007 || Kitt Peak || Spacewatch || — || align=right data-sort-value="0.82" | 820 m || 
|-id=112 bgcolor=#d6d6d6
| 462112 ||  || — || August 12, 2007 || Socorro || LINEAR || — || align=right | 3.1 km || 
|-id=113 bgcolor=#d6d6d6
| 462113 ||  || — || September 10, 2007 || Mount Lemmon || Mount Lemmon Survey || — || align=right | 2.6 km || 
|-id=114 bgcolor=#d6d6d6
| 462114 ||  || — || September 10, 2007 || Mount Lemmon || Mount Lemmon Survey || — || align=right | 2.7 km || 
|-id=115 bgcolor=#d6d6d6
| 462115 ||  || — || September 11, 2007 || Kitt Peak || Spacewatch || — || align=right | 2.6 km || 
|-id=116 bgcolor=#d6d6d6
| 462116 ||  || — || September 11, 2007 || Kitt Peak || Spacewatch || 7:4 || align=right | 2.7 km || 
|-id=117 bgcolor=#fefefe
| 462117 ||  || — || September 12, 2007 || Mount Lemmon || Mount Lemmon Survey || MAS || align=right data-sort-value="0.57" | 570 m || 
|-id=118 bgcolor=#fefefe
| 462118 ||  || — || September 15, 2007 || Great Shefford || P. Birtwhistle || — || align=right data-sort-value="0.70" | 700 m || 
|-id=119 bgcolor=#fefefe
| 462119 ||  || — || September 6, 2007 || Anderson Mesa || LONEOS || — || align=right data-sort-value="0.80" | 800 m || 
|-id=120 bgcolor=#d6d6d6
| 462120 ||  || — || September 14, 2007 || Socorro || LINEAR || — || align=right | 3.0 km || 
|-id=121 bgcolor=#fefefe
| 462121 ||  || — || August 24, 2007 || Kitt Peak || Spacewatch || V || align=right data-sort-value="0.44" | 440 m || 
|-id=122 bgcolor=#d6d6d6
| 462122 ||  || — || September 12, 2007 || Mount Lemmon || Mount Lemmon Survey || — || align=right | 2.5 km || 
|-id=123 bgcolor=#fefefe
| 462123 ||  || — || September 10, 2007 || Mount Lemmon || Mount Lemmon Survey || — || align=right data-sort-value="0.57" | 570 m || 
|-id=124 bgcolor=#d6d6d6
| 462124 ||  || — || September 13, 2007 || Mount Lemmon || Mount Lemmon Survey || — || align=right | 2.9 km || 
|-id=125 bgcolor=#d6d6d6
| 462125 ||  || — || September 11, 2007 || Kitt Peak || Spacewatch || — || align=right | 2.0 km || 
|-id=126 bgcolor=#d6d6d6
| 462126 ||  || — || September 11, 2007 || Kitt Peak || Spacewatch || EOS || align=right | 1.6 km || 
|-id=127 bgcolor=#d6d6d6
| 462127 ||  || — || September 13, 2007 || Kitt Peak || Spacewatch || — || align=right | 2.4 km || 
|-id=128 bgcolor=#fefefe
| 462128 ||  || — || September 11, 2007 || Kitt Peak || Spacewatch || — || align=right data-sort-value="0.64" | 640 m || 
|-id=129 bgcolor=#d6d6d6
| 462129 ||  || — || March 8, 2005 || Mount Lemmon || Mount Lemmon Survey || Tj (2.99) || align=right | 4.4 km || 
|-id=130 bgcolor=#d6d6d6
| 462130 ||  || — || September 12, 2007 || Mount Lemmon || Mount Lemmon Survey || — || align=right | 3.1 km || 
|-id=131 bgcolor=#fefefe
| 462131 ||  || — || September 9, 2007 || Kitt Peak || Spacewatch || — || align=right data-sort-value="0.88" | 880 m || 
|-id=132 bgcolor=#d6d6d6
| 462132 ||  || — || August 11, 2002 || Cerro Tololo || M. W. Buie || — || align=right | 2.6 km || 
|-id=133 bgcolor=#fefefe
| 462133 ||  || — || September 3, 2007 || Catalina || CSS || — || align=right data-sort-value="0.66" | 660 m || 
|-id=134 bgcolor=#d6d6d6
| 462134 ||  || — || September 11, 2007 || Catalina || CSS || Tj (2.99) || align=right | 3.4 km || 
|-id=135 bgcolor=#fefefe
| 462135 ||  || — || September 12, 2007 || Mount Lemmon || Mount Lemmon Survey || — || align=right data-sort-value="0.83" | 830 m || 
|-id=136 bgcolor=#d6d6d6
| 462136 ||  || — || September 10, 2007 || Kitt Peak || Spacewatch || — || align=right | 2.3 km || 
|-id=137 bgcolor=#fefefe
| 462137 ||  || — || September 13, 2007 || Mount Lemmon || Mount Lemmon Survey || — || align=right data-sort-value="0.64" | 640 m || 
|-id=138 bgcolor=#fefefe
| 462138 ||  || — || September 8, 2007 || Mount Lemmon || Mount Lemmon Survey || — || align=right data-sort-value="0.60" | 600 m || 
|-id=139 bgcolor=#fefefe
| 462139 ||  || — || September 25, 2007 || Mount Lemmon || Mount Lemmon Survey || — || align=right data-sort-value="0.94" | 940 m || 
|-id=140 bgcolor=#fefefe
| 462140 ||  || — || September 19, 2007 || Kitt Peak || Spacewatch || — || align=right data-sort-value="0.65" | 650 m || 
|-id=141 bgcolor=#d6d6d6
| 462141 ||  || — || October 4, 2007 || Mount Lemmon || Mount Lemmon Survey || — || align=right | 2.9 km || 
|-id=142 bgcolor=#fefefe
| 462142 ||  || — || October 6, 2007 || Socorro || LINEAR || — || align=right data-sort-value="0.82" | 820 m || 
|-id=143 bgcolor=#fefefe
| 462143 ||  || — || October 4, 2007 || Kitt Peak || Spacewatch || — || align=right data-sort-value="0.76" | 760 m || 
|-id=144 bgcolor=#fefefe
| 462144 ||  || — || September 8, 2007 || Mount Lemmon || Mount Lemmon Survey || MAS || align=right data-sort-value="0.68" | 680 m || 
|-id=145 bgcolor=#d6d6d6
| 462145 ||  || — || October 7, 2007 || Mount Lemmon || Mount Lemmon Survey || — || align=right | 3.0 km || 
|-id=146 bgcolor=#fefefe
| 462146 ||  || — || October 4, 2007 || Kitt Peak || Spacewatch || — || align=right data-sort-value="0.60" | 600 m || 
|-id=147 bgcolor=#fefefe
| 462147 ||  || — || October 4, 2007 || Kitt Peak || Spacewatch || — || align=right data-sort-value="0.83" | 830 m || 
|-id=148 bgcolor=#fefefe
| 462148 ||  || — || October 4, 2007 || Kitt Peak || Spacewatch || MAS || align=right data-sort-value="0.57" | 570 m || 
|-id=149 bgcolor=#FA8072
| 462149 ||  || — || October 7, 2007 || Bergisch Gladbac || W. Bickel || H || align=right data-sort-value="0.56" | 560 m || 
|-id=150 bgcolor=#fefefe
| 462150 ||  || — || October 10, 2007 || Mount Lemmon || Mount Lemmon Survey || — || align=right data-sort-value="0.68" | 680 m || 
|-id=151 bgcolor=#fefefe
| 462151 ||  || — || February 4, 2005 || Kitt Peak || Spacewatch || NYS || align=right data-sort-value="0.49" | 490 m || 
|-id=152 bgcolor=#fefefe
| 462152 ||  || — || October 8, 2007 || Kitt Peak || Spacewatch || NYS || align=right data-sort-value="0.49" | 490 m || 
|-id=153 bgcolor=#fefefe
| 462153 ||  || — || October 8, 2007 || Catalina || CSS || — || align=right data-sort-value="0.81" | 810 m || 
|-id=154 bgcolor=#fefefe
| 462154 ||  || — || October 9, 2007 || Kitt Peak || Spacewatch || NYS || align=right data-sort-value="0.50" | 500 m || 
|-id=155 bgcolor=#fefefe
| 462155 ||  || — || October 6, 2007 || Kitt Peak || Spacewatch || V || align=right data-sort-value="0.48" | 480 m || 
|-id=156 bgcolor=#fefefe
| 462156 ||  || — || October 6, 2007 || Kitt Peak || Spacewatch || — || align=right data-sort-value="0.77" | 770 m || 
|-id=157 bgcolor=#fefefe
| 462157 ||  || — || September 10, 2007 || Catalina || CSS || — || align=right data-sort-value="0.86" | 860 m || 
|-id=158 bgcolor=#fefefe
| 462158 ||  || — || September 8, 2007 || Mount Lemmon || Mount Lemmon Survey || — || align=right data-sort-value="0.78" | 780 m || 
|-id=159 bgcolor=#fefefe
| 462159 ||  || — || October 12, 2007 || Socorro || LINEAR || — || align=right data-sort-value="0.80" | 800 m || 
|-id=160 bgcolor=#fefefe
| 462160 ||  || — || September 14, 2007 || Mount Lemmon || Mount Lemmon Survey || — || align=right data-sort-value="0.83" | 830 m || 
|-id=161 bgcolor=#d6d6d6
| 462161 ||  || — || September 9, 2007 || Mount Lemmon || Mount Lemmon Survey || — || align=right | 4.1 km || 
|-id=162 bgcolor=#fefefe
| 462162 ||  || — || October 8, 2007 || Mount Lemmon || Mount Lemmon Survey || — || align=right data-sort-value="0.69" | 690 m || 
|-id=163 bgcolor=#d6d6d6
| 462163 ||  || — || October 10, 2007 || Catalina || CSS || — || align=right | 3.7 km || 
|-id=164 bgcolor=#d6d6d6
| 462164 ||  || — || October 5, 2007 || Kitt Peak || Spacewatch || EOS || align=right | 2.1 km || 
|-id=165 bgcolor=#d6d6d6
| 462165 ||  || — || October 8, 2007 || Kitt Peak || Spacewatch || — || align=right | 3.4 km || 
|-id=166 bgcolor=#fefefe
| 462166 ||  || — || September 2, 2000 || Anderson Mesa || LONEOS || — || align=right data-sort-value="0.81" | 810 m || 
|-id=167 bgcolor=#d6d6d6
| 462167 ||  || — || September 14, 2007 || Mount Lemmon || Mount Lemmon Survey || — || align=right | 3.0 km || 
|-id=168 bgcolor=#fefefe
| 462168 ||  || — || October 10, 2007 || Mount Lemmon || Mount Lemmon Survey || NYS || align=right data-sort-value="0.41" | 410 m || 
|-id=169 bgcolor=#fefefe
| 462169 ||  || — || September 14, 2007 || Mount Lemmon || Mount Lemmon Survey || — || align=right data-sort-value="0.60" | 600 m || 
|-id=170 bgcolor=#fefefe
| 462170 ||  || — || September 25, 2007 || Mount Lemmon || Mount Lemmon Survey || — || align=right data-sort-value="0.76" | 760 m || 
|-id=171 bgcolor=#d6d6d6
| 462171 ||  || — || September 14, 2007 || Mount Lemmon || Mount Lemmon Survey || LIX || align=right | 3.5 km || 
|-id=172 bgcolor=#fefefe
| 462172 ||  || — || October 9, 2007 || Kitt Peak || Spacewatch || — || align=right data-sort-value="0.73" | 730 m || 
|-id=173 bgcolor=#fefefe
| 462173 ||  || — || October 9, 2007 || Kitt Peak || Spacewatch || — || align=right data-sort-value="0.88" | 880 m || 
|-id=174 bgcolor=#fefefe
| 462174 ||  || — || September 14, 2007 || Kitt Peak || Spacewatch || H || align=right data-sort-value="0.54" | 540 m || 
|-id=175 bgcolor=#fefefe
| 462175 ||  || — || September 14, 2007 || Mount Lemmon || Mount Lemmon Survey || MAS || align=right data-sort-value="0.71" | 710 m || 
|-id=176 bgcolor=#fefefe
| 462176 ||  || — || October 11, 2007 || Kitt Peak || Spacewatch || — || align=right data-sort-value="0.56" | 560 m || 
|-id=177 bgcolor=#fefefe
| 462177 ||  || — || September 19, 2007 || Kitt Peak || Spacewatch || — || align=right data-sort-value="0.75" | 750 m || 
|-id=178 bgcolor=#fefefe
| 462178 ||  || — || October 14, 2007 || Mount Lemmon || Mount Lemmon Survey || NYS || align=right data-sort-value="0.68" | 680 m || 
|-id=179 bgcolor=#fefefe
| 462179 ||  || — || October 10, 2007 || Catalina || CSS || — || align=right data-sort-value="0.86" | 860 m || 
|-id=180 bgcolor=#fefefe
| 462180 ||  || — || September 20, 2007 || Catalina || CSS || — || align=right data-sort-value="0.91" | 910 m || 
|-id=181 bgcolor=#fefefe
| 462181 ||  || — || October 14, 2007 || Kitt Peak || Spacewatch || — || align=right data-sort-value="0.81" | 810 m || 
|-id=182 bgcolor=#d6d6d6
| 462182 ||  || — || October 7, 2007 || Mount Lemmon || Mount Lemmon Survey || — || align=right | 3.3 km || 
|-id=183 bgcolor=#fefefe
| 462183 ||  || — || October 15, 2007 || Kitt Peak || Spacewatch || V || align=right data-sort-value="0.59" | 590 m || 
|-id=184 bgcolor=#fefefe
| 462184 ||  || — || October 10, 2007 || Catalina || CSS || — || align=right data-sort-value="0.86" | 860 m || 
|-id=185 bgcolor=#fefefe
| 462185 ||  || — || October 4, 2007 || Kitt Peak || Spacewatch || — || align=right data-sort-value="0.74" | 740 m || 
|-id=186 bgcolor=#fefefe
| 462186 ||  || — || October 10, 2007 || Catalina || CSS || — || align=right data-sort-value="0.76" | 760 m || 
|-id=187 bgcolor=#fefefe
| 462187 ||  || — || October 9, 2007 || Kitt Peak || Spacewatch || NYS || align=right data-sort-value="0.67" | 670 m || 
|-id=188 bgcolor=#fefefe
| 462188 ||  || — || October 10, 2007 || Catalina || CSS || — || align=right | 1.0 km || 
|-id=189 bgcolor=#fefefe
| 462189 ||  || — || October 16, 2007 || Kitt Peak || Spacewatch || (5026) || align=right data-sort-value="0.74" | 740 m || 
|-id=190 bgcolor=#fefefe
| 462190 ||  || — || October 10, 2007 || Catalina || CSS || — || align=right data-sort-value="0.92" | 920 m || 
|-id=191 bgcolor=#fefefe
| 462191 ||  || — || September 25, 2007 || Mount Lemmon || Mount Lemmon Survey || — || align=right data-sort-value="0.69" | 690 m || 
|-id=192 bgcolor=#fefefe
| 462192 ||  || — || October 30, 2007 || Kitt Peak || Spacewatch || — || align=right data-sort-value="0.78" | 780 m || 
|-id=193 bgcolor=#fefefe
| 462193 ||  || — || October 10, 2007 || Kitt Peak || Spacewatch || — || align=right data-sort-value="0.86" | 860 m || 
|-id=194 bgcolor=#fefefe
| 462194 ||  || — || September 14, 2007 || Mount Lemmon || Mount Lemmon Survey || V || align=right data-sort-value="0.46" | 460 m || 
|-id=195 bgcolor=#fefefe
| 462195 ||  || — || October 18, 2007 || Kitt Peak || Spacewatch || — || align=right data-sort-value="0.63" | 630 m || 
|-id=196 bgcolor=#d6d6d6
| 462196 ||  || — || October 24, 2007 || Mount Lemmon || Mount Lemmon Survey || — || align=right | 5.3 km || 
|-id=197 bgcolor=#fefefe
| 462197 ||  || — || October 24, 2007 || Mount Lemmon || Mount Lemmon Survey || MAS || align=right data-sort-value="0.60" | 600 m || 
|-id=198 bgcolor=#fefefe
| 462198 ||  || — || October 30, 2007 || Mount Lemmon || Mount Lemmon Survey || — || align=right data-sort-value="0.76" | 760 m || 
|-id=199 bgcolor=#fefefe
| 462199 ||  || — || November 2, 2007 || Kitt Peak || Spacewatch || — || align=right data-sort-value="0.75" | 750 m || 
|-id=200 bgcolor=#fefefe
| 462200 ||  || — || November 1, 2007 || Kitt Peak || Spacewatch || — || align=right data-sort-value="0.54" | 540 m || 
|}

462201–462300 

|-bgcolor=#fefefe
| 462201 ||  || — || August 22, 2003 || Socorro || LINEAR || — || align=right data-sort-value="0.78" | 780 m || 
|-id=202 bgcolor=#fefefe
| 462202 ||  || — || November 1, 2007 || Kitt Peak || Spacewatch || — || align=right data-sort-value="0.72" | 720 m || 
|-id=203 bgcolor=#fefefe
| 462203 ||  || — || October 8, 2007 || Catalina || CSS || — || align=right data-sort-value="0.81" | 810 m || 
|-id=204 bgcolor=#fefefe
| 462204 ||  || — || October 9, 2007 || Kitt Peak || Spacewatch || — || align=right data-sort-value="0.73" | 730 m || 
|-id=205 bgcolor=#fefefe
| 462205 ||  || — || October 20, 2007 || Mount Lemmon || Mount Lemmon Survey || MAS || align=right data-sort-value="0.63" | 630 m || 
|-id=206 bgcolor=#fefefe
| 462206 ||  || — || September 10, 2007 || Mount Lemmon || Mount Lemmon Survey || NYS || align=right data-sort-value="0.70" | 700 m || 
|-id=207 bgcolor=#fefefe
| 462207 ||  || — || October 9, 2007 || XuYi || PMO NEO || — || align=right data-sort-value="0.90" | 900 m || 
|-id=208 bgcolor=#fefefe
| 462208 ||  || — || November 4, 2007 || Kitt Peak || Spacewatch || NYS || align=right data-sort-value="0.48" | 480 m || 
|-id=209 bgcolor=#fefefe
| 462209 ||  || — || November 5, 2007 || Kitt Peak || Spacewatch || — || align=right data-sort-value="0.69" | 690 m || 
|-id=210 bgcolor=#fefefe
| 462210 ||  || — || November 5, 2007 || Kitt Peak || Spacewatch || — || align=right data-sort-value="0.62" | 620 m || 
|-id=211 bgcolor=#fefefe
| 462211 ||  || — || November 7, 2007 || Catalina || CSS || — || align=right data-sort-value="0.98" | 980 m || 
|-id=212 bgcolor=#fefefe
| 462212 ||  || — || October 16, 2007 || Mount Lemmon || Mount Lemmon Survey || — || align=right data-sort-value="0.63" | 630 m || 
|-id=213 bgcolor=#fefefe
| 462213 ||  || — || November 9, 2007 || Mount Lemmon || Mount Lemmon Survey || — || align=right data-sort-value="0.59" | 590 m || 
|-id=214 bgcolor=#fefefe
| 462214 ||  || — || November 9, 2007 || Kitt Peak || Spacewatch || V || align=right data-sort-value="0.67" | 670 m || 
|-id=215 bgcolor=#fefefe
| 462215 ||  || — || October 9, 2007 || XuYi || PMO NEO || — || align=right data-sort-value="0.70" | 700 m || 
|-id=216 bgcolor=#fefefe
| 462216 ||  || — || November 7, 2007 || Catalina || CSS || — || align=right data-sort-value="0.92" | 920 m || 
|-id=217 bgcolor=#fefefe
| 462217 ||  || — || November 15, 2007 || Mount Lemmon || Mount Lemmon Survey || — || align=right | 1.2 km || 
|-id=218 bgcolor=#fefefe
| 462218 ||  || — || November 14, 2007 || Socorro || LINEAR || — || align=right data-sort-value="0.71" | 710 m || 
|-id=219 bgcolor=#fefefe
| 462219 ||  || — || November 8, 2007 || Catalina || CSS || — || align=right data-sort-value="0.91" | 910 m || 
|-id=220 bgcolor=#fefefe
| 462220 ||  || — || September 10, 2007 || Mount Lemmon || Mount Lemmon Survey || — || align=right data-sort-value="0.82" | 820 m || 
|-id=221 bgcolor=#d6d6d6
| 462221 ||  || — || November 19, 2007 || Mount Lemmon || Mount Lemmon Survey || (260)7:4 || align=right | 5.3 km || 
|-id=222 bgcolor=#fefefe
| 462222 ||  || — || November 20, 2007 || Mount Lemmon || Mount Lemmon Survey || — || align=right data-sort-value="0.67" | 670 m || 
|-id=223 bgcolor=#fefefe
| 462223 ||  || — || November 19, 2007 || Kitt Peak || Spacewatch || — || align=right | 1.0 km || 
|-id=224 bgcolor=#fefefe
| 462224 ||  || — || November 9, 2007 || Socorro || LINEAR || H || align=right data-sort-value="0.82" | 820 m || 
|-id=225 bgcolor=#fefefe
| 462225 ||  || — || December 13, 2007 || Socorro || LINEAR || — || align=right | 1.2 km || 
|-id=226 bgcolor=#E9E9E9
| 462226 ||  || — || December 3, 2007 || Kitt Peak || Spacewatch || — || align=right | 1.4 km || 
|-id=227 bgcolor=#fefefe
| 462227 ||  || — || December 30, 2007 || Kitt Peak || Spacewatch || MAS || align=right data-sort-value="0.70" | 700 m || 
|-id=228 bgcolor=#fefefe
| 462228 ||  || — || December 18, 2007 || Kitt Peak || Spacewatch || — || align=right data-sort-value="0.87" | 870 m || 
|-id=229 bgcolor=#fefefe
| 462229 ||  || — || December 20, 2007 || Kitt Peak || Spacewatch || NYS || align=right data-sort-value="0.52" | 520 m || 
|-id=230 bgcolor=#E9E9E9
| 462230 ||  || — || January 10, 2008 || Kitt Peak || Spacewatch || — || align=right data-sort-value="0.67" | 670 m || 
|-id=231 bgcolor=#fefefe
| 462231 ||  || — || January 10, 2008 || Kitt Peak || Spacewatch || H || align=right data-sort-value="0.84" | 840 m || 
|-id=232 bgcolor=#fefefe
| 462232 ||  || — || December 31, 2007 || Mount Lemmon || Mount Lemmon Survey || NYS || align=right data-sort-value="0.48" | 480 m || 
|-id=233 bgcolor=#fefefe
| 462233 ||  || — || November 19, 2007 || Mount Lemmon || Mount Lemmon Survey || — || align=right | 1.0 km || 
|-id=234 bgcolor=#fefefe
| 462234 ||  || — || January 12, 2008 || Kitt Peak || Spacewatch || H || align=right data-sort-value="0.56" | 560 m || 
|-id=235 bgcolor=#d6d6d6
| 462235 ||  || — || January 15, 2008 || Kitt Peak || Spacewatch || 3:2 || align=right | 3.9 km || 
|-id=236 bgcolor=#E9E9E9
| 462236 ||  || — || January 15, 2008 || Mount Lemmon || Mount Lemmon Survey || — || align=right data-sort-value="0.83" | 830 m || 
|-id=237 bgcolor=#d6d6d6
| 462237 ||  || — || January 30, 2008 || Kitt Peak || Spacewatch || SHU3:2 || align=right | 5.7 km || 
|-id=238 bgcolor=#FFC2E0
| 462238 ||  || — || February 2, 2008 || Catalina || CSS || ATEPHAcritical || align=right data-sort-value="0.23" | 230 m || 
|-id=239 bgcolor=#fefefe
| 462239 ||  || — || February 2, 2008 || Mount Lemmon || Mount Lemmon Survey || — || align=right data-sort-value="0.91" | 910 m || 
|-id=240 bgcolor=#fefefe
| 462240 ||  || — || February 2, 2008 || Kitt Peak || Spacewatch || NYS || align=right data-sort-value="0.65" | 650 m || 
|-id=241 bgcolor=#fefefe
| 462241 ||  || — || February 8, 2008 || Mount Lemmon || Mount Lemmon Survey || NYS || align=right data-sort-value="0.61" | 610 m || 
|-id=242 bgcolor=#d6d6d6
| 462242 ||  || — || November 20, 2007 || Mount Lemmon || Mount Lemmon Survey || 3:2 || align=right | 3.9 km || 
|-id=243 bgcolor=#fefefe
| 462243 ||  || — || February 7, 2008 || Kitt Peak || Spacewatch || H || align=right data-sort-value="0.64" | 640 m || 
|-id=244 bgcolor=#E9E9E9
| 462244 ||  || — || February 7, 2008 || Kitt Peak || Spacewatch || — || align=right data-sort-value="0.78" | 780 m || 
|-id=245 bgcolor=#E9E9E9
| 462245 ||  || — || February 7, 2008 || Mount Lemmon || Mount Lemmon Survey || — || align=right data-sort-value="0.96" | 960 m || 
|-id=246 bgcolor=#fefefe
| 462246 ||  || — || February 8, 2008 || Kitt Peak || Spacewatch || — || align=right data-sort-value="0.64" | 640 m || 
|-id=247 bgcolor=#fefefe
| 462247 ||  || — || January 14, 2008 || Kitt Peak || Spacewatch || — || align=right data-sort-value="0.84" | 840 m || 
|-id=248 bgcolor=#fefefe
| 462248 ||  || — || February 9, 2008 || Kitt Peak || Spacewatch || H || align=right data-sort-value="0.57" | 570 m || 
|-id=249 bgcolor=#fefefe
| 462249 ||  || — || February 9, 2008 || Kitt Peak || Spacewatch || — || align=right data-sort-value="0.68" | 680 m || 
|-id=250 bgcolor=#E9E9E9
| 462250 ||  || — || February 12, 2008 || Mount Lemmon || Mount Lemmon Survey || — || align=right data-sort-value="0.79" | 790 m || 
|-id=251 bgcolor=#E9E9E9
| 462251 ||  || — || February 14, 2008 || Catalina || CSS || — || align=right | 1.0 km || 
|-id=252 bgcolor=#E9E9E9
| 462252 ||  || — || February 2, 2008 || Mount Lemmon || Mount Lemmon Survey || — || align=right | 1.4 km || 
|-id=253 bgcolor=#fefefe
| 462253 ||  || — || February 27, 2008 || Kitt Peak || Spacewatch || V || align=right data-sort-value="0.61" | 610 m || 
|-id=254 bgcolor=#fefefe
| 462254 ||  || — || February 29, 2008 || Catalina || CSS || H || align=right data-sort-value="0.76" | 760 m || 
|-id=255 bgcolor=#fefefe
| 462255 ||  || — || January 20, 2008 || Kitt Peak || Spacewatch || — || align=right data-sort-value="0.78" | 780 m || 
|-id=256 bgcolor=#E9E9E9
| 462256 ||  || — || February 13, 2008 || Mount Lemmon || Mount Lemmon Survey || — || align=right | 1.1 km || 
|-id=257 bgcolor=#fefefe
| 462257 ||  || — || February 26, 2008 || Mount Lemmon || Mount Lemmon Survey || — || align=right data-sort-value="0.84" | 840 m || 
|-id=258 bgcolor=#fefefe
| 462258 ||  || — || February 27, 2008 || Mount Lemmon || Mount Lemmon Survey || — || align=right data-sort-value="0.86" | 860 m || 
|-id=259 bgcolor=#E9E9E9
| 462259 ||  || — || January 30, 2008 || Mount Lemmon || Mount Lemmon Survey || EUN || align=right | 1.1 km || 
|-id=260 bgcolor=#fefefe
| 462260 ||  || — || March 3, 2008 || Jarnac || Jarnac Obs. || H || align=right data-sort-value="0.71" | 710 m || 
|-id=261 bgcolor=#E9E9E9
| 462261 ||  || — || February 2, 2008 || Mount Lemmon || Mount Lemmon Survey || — || align=right data-sort-value="0.68" | 680 m || 
|-id=262 bgcolor=#E9E9E9
| 462262 ||  || — || February 2, 2008 || Mount Lemmon || Mount Lemmon Survey || (5) || align=right data-sort-value="0.65" | 650 m || 
|-id=263 bgcolor=#d6d6d6
| 462263 ||  || — || March 6, 2008 || Mount Lemmon || Mount Lemmon Survey || 3:2 || align=right | 3.0 km || 
|-id=264 bgcolor=#fefefe
| 462264 ||  || — || February 28, 2008 || Kitt Peak || Spacewatch || H || align=right data-sort-value="0.68" | 680 m || 
|-id=265 bgcolor=#fefefe
| 462265 ||  || — || February 28, 2008 || Kitt Peak || Spacewatch || — || align=right data-sort-value="0.84" | 840 m || 
|-id=266 bgcolor=#fefefe
| 462266 ||  || — || March 1, 2008 || Anderson Mesa || LONEOS || H || align=right data-sort-value="0.50" | 500 m || 
|-id=267 bgcolor=#E9E9E9
| 462267 ||  || — || March 8, 2008 || Kitt Peak || Spacewatch || — || align=right data-sort-value="0.64" | 640 m || 
|-id=268 bgcolor=#E9E9E9
| 462268 ||  || — || March 8, 2008 || Kitt Peak || Spacewatch || — || align=right data-sort-value="0.81" | 810 m || 
|-id=269 bgcolor=#E9E9E9
| 462269 ||  || — || February 12, 2008 || Kitt Peak || Spacewatch || — || align=right data-sort-value="0.68" | 680 m || 
|-id=270 bgcolor=#fefefe
| 462270 ||  || — || March 11, 2008 || Kitt Peak || Spacewatch || H || align=right data-sort-value="0.52" | 520 m || 
|-id=271 bgcolor=#E9E9E9
| 462271 ||  || — || February 28, 2008 || Kitt Peak || Spacewatch || (5) || align=right data-sort-value="0.78" | 780 m || 
|-id=272 bgcolor=#E9E9E9
| 462272 ||  || — || March 11, 2008 || Kitt Peak || Spacewatch || — || align=right data-sort-value="0.75" | 750 m || 
|-id=273 bgcolor=#E9E9E9
| 462273 ||  || — || March 1, 2008 || Kitt Peak || Spacewatch || — || align=right data-sort-value="0.64" | 640 m || 
|-id=274 bgcolor=#E9E9E9
| 462274 ||  || — || March 5, 2008 || Mount Lemmon || Mount Lemmon Survey || — || align=right | 1.5 km || 
|-id=275 bgcolor=#E9E9E9
| 462275 ||  || — || March 10, 2008 || Kitt Peak || Spacewatch || — || align=right data-sort-value="0.85" | 850 m || 
|-id=276 bgcolor=#E9E9E9
| 462276 ||  || — || March 15, 2008 || Mount Lemmon || Mount Lemmon Survey || — || align=right | 1.2 km || 
|-id=277 bgcolor=#E9E9E9
| 462277 ||  || — || March 13, 2008 || Kitt Peak || Spacewatch || — || align=right | 1.5 km || 
|-id=278 bgcolor=#E9E9E9
| 462278 ||  || — || March 15, 2008 || Kitt Peak || Spacewatch || (5) || align=right data-sort-value="0.70" | 700 m || 
|-id=279 bgcolor=#E9E9E9
| 462279 ||  || — || March 10, 2008 || Kitt Peak || Spacewatch || — || align=right data-sort-value="0.59" | 590 m || 
|-id=280 bgcolor=#E9E9E9
| 462280 ||  || — || February 8, 2008 || Kitt Peak || Spacewatch || — || align=right | 1.3 km || 
|-id=281 bgcolor=#E9E9E9
| 462281 ||  || — || February 7, 2008 || Mount Lemmon || Mount Lemmon Survey || — || align=right data-sort-value="0.71" | 710 m || 
|-id=282 bgcolor=#E9E9E9
| 462282 ||  || — || March 26, 2008 || Mount Lemmon || Mount Lemmon Survey || — || align=right data-sort-value="0.60" | 600 m || 
|-id=283 bgcolor=#E9E9E9
| 462283 ||  || — || March 27, 2008 || Kitt Peak || Spacewatch || — || align=right | 1.2 km || 
|-id=284 bgcolor=#fefefe
| 462284 ||  || — || March 27, 2008 || Kitt Peak || Spacewatch || H || align=right data-sort-value="0.68" | 680 m || 
|-id=285 bgcolor=#fefefe
| 462285 ||  || — || March 3, 2008 || Kitt Peak || Spacewatch || H || align=right data-sort-value="0.77" | 770 m || 
|-id=286 bgcolor=#E9E9E9
| 462286 ||  || — || March 5, 2008 || Mount Lemmon || Mount Lemmon Survey || MAR || align=right | 1.4 km || 
|-id=287 bgcolor=#E9E9E9
| 462287 ||  || — || March 28, 2008 || Mount Lemmon || Mount Lemmon Survey || — || align=right | 1.3 km || 
|-id=288 bgcolor=#E9E9E9
| 462288 ||  || — || March 28, 2008 || Mount Lemmon || Mount Lemmon Survey || — || align=right data-sort-value="0.71" | 710 m || 
|-id=289 bgcolor=#E9E9E9
| 462289 ||  || — || March 28, 2008 || Mount Lemmon || Mount Lemmon Survey || — || align=right data-sort-value="0.82" | 820 m || 
|-id=290 bgcolor=#E9E9E9
| 462290 ||  || — || March 28, 2008 || Mount Lemmon || Mount Lemmon Survey || — || align=right | 1.2 km || 
|-id=291 bgcolor=#E9E9E9
| 462291 ||  || — || March 27, 2008 || Kitt Peak || Spacewatch || — || align=right data-sort-value="0.90" | 900 m || 
|-id=292 bgcolor=#E9E9E9
| 462292 ||  || — || March 28, 2008 || Kitt Peak || Spacewatch || — || align=right data-sort-value="0.90" | 900 m || 
|-id=293 bgcolor=#E9E9E9
| 462293 ||  || — || March 10, 2008 || Mount Lemmon || Mount Lemmon Survey || (5) || align=right data-sort-value="0.67" | 670 m || 
|-id=294 bgcolor=#E9E9E9
| 462294 ||  || — || March 30, 2008 || Kitt Peak || Spacewatch || — || align=right data-sort-value="0.67" | 670 m || 
|-id=295 bgcolor=#fefefe
| 462295 ||  || — || March 28, 2008 || Mount Lemmon || Mount Lemmon Survey || H || align=right data-sort-value="0.73" | 730 m || 
|-id=296 bgcolor=#fefefe
| 462296 ||  || — || March 29, 2008 || Catalina || CSS || H || align=right data-sort-value="0.85" | 850 m || 
|-id=297 bgcolor=#fefefe
| 462297 ||  || — || March 30, 2008 || Kitt Peak || Spacewatch || H || align=right data-sort-value="0.75" | 750 m || 
|-id=298 bgcolor=#E9E9E9
| 462298 ||  || — || March 31, 2008 || Kitt Peak || Spacewatch || — || align=right data-sort-value="0.90" | 900 m || 
|-id=299 bgcolor=#E9E9E9
| 462299 ||  || — || March 26, 2008 || Mount Lemmon || Mount Lemmon Survey || — || align=right | 1.2 km || 
|-id=300 bgcolor=#E9E9E9
| 462300 ||  || — || March 12, 2008 || Kitt Peak || Spacewatch || — || align=right data-sort-value="0.98" | 980 m || 
|}

462301–462400 

|-bgcolor=#E9E9E9
| 462301 ||  || — || March 31, 2008 || Mount Lemmon || Mount Lemmon Survey || — || align=right data-sort-value="0.64" | 640 m || 
|-id=302 bgcolor=#E9E9E9
| 462302 ||  || — || January 30, 2008 || Mount Lemmon || Mount Lemmon Survey || — || align=right data-sort-value="0.80" | 800 m || 
|-id=303 bgcolor=#fefefe
| 462303 ||  || — || April 3, 2008 || Mount Lemmon || Mount Lemmon Survey || H || align=right data-sort-value="0.65" | 650 m || 
|-id=304 bgcolor=#E9E9E9
| 462304 ||  || — || March 27, 2008 || Kitt Peak || Spacewatch || — || align=right | 1.2 km || 
|-id=305 bgcolor=#E9E9E9
| 462305 ||  || — || April 6, 2008 || Mount Lemmon || Mount Lemmon Survey || — || align=right | 1.4 km || 
|-id=306 bgcolor=#E9E9E9
| 462306 ||  || — || March 12, 2008 || Kitt Peak || Spacewatch || — || align=right data-sort-value="0.88" | 880 m || 
|-id=307 bgcolor=#E9E9E9
| 462307 ||  || — || April 8, 2008 || Mount Lemmon || Mount Lemmon Survey || — || align=right | 1.4 km || 
|-id=308 bgcolor=#E9E9E9
| 462308 ||  || — || February 11, 2008 || Mount Lemmon || Mount Lemmon Survey || — || align=right data-sort-value="0.98" | 980 m || 
|-id=309 bgcolor=#E9E9E9
| 462309 ||  || — || April 6, 2008 || Mount Lemmon || Mount Lemmon Survey || — || align=right data-sort-value="0.79" | 790 m || 
|-id=310 bgcolor=#E9E9E9
| 462310 ||  || — || April 4, 2008 || Kitt Peak || Spacewatch || — || align=right | 1.5 km || 
|-id=311 bgcolor=#E9E9E9
| 462311 ||  || — || April 10, 2008 || Kitt Peak || Spacewatch || — || align=right data-sort-value="0.87" | 870 m || 
|-id=312 bgcolor=#E9E9E9
| 462312 ||  || — || March 31, 2008 || Kitt Peak || Spacewatch || KON || align=right | 1.6 km || 
|-id=313 bgcolor=#E9E9E9
| 462313 ||  || — || November 18, 2006 || Kitt Peak || Spacewatch || — || align=right | 1.5 km || 
|-id=314 bgcolor=#E9E9E9
| 462314 ||  || — || April 6, 2008 || Kitt Peak || Spacewatch || EUN || align=right data-sort-value="0.78" | 780 m || 
|-id=315 bgcolor=#E9E9E9
| 462315 ||  || — || April 30, 2004 || Kitt Peak || Spacewatch || — || align=right data-sort-value="0.83" | 830 m || 
|-id=316 bgcolor=#E9E9E9
| 462316 ||  || — || April 3, 2008 || Mount Lemmon || Mount Lemmon Survey || — || align=right | 1.1 km || 
|-id=317 bgcolor=#E9E9E9
| 462317 ||  || — || April 6, 2008 || Mount Lemmon || Mount Lemmon Survey || — || align=right | 1.3 km || 
|-id=318 bgcolor=#E9E9E9
| 462318 ||  || — || January 17, 2007 || Kitt Peak || Spacewatch || — || align=right | 2.1 km || 
|-id=319 bgcolor=#E9E9E9
| 462319 ||  || — || April 26, 2008 || Kitt Peak || Spacewatch || — || align=right data-sort-value="0.85" | 850 m || 
|-id=320 bgcolor=#E9E9E9
| 462320 ||  || — || April 27, 2008 || Kitt Peak || Spacewatch || — || align=right | 2.5 km || 
|-id=321 bgcolor=#E9E9E9
| 462321 ||  || — || April 28, 2008 || Mount Lemmon || Mount Lemmon Survey || — || align=right | 1.1 km || 
|-id=322 bgcolor=#E9E9E9
| 462322 ||  || — || April 27, 2008 || Mount Lemmon || Mount Lemmon Survey || MAR || align=right | 1.2 km || 
|-id=323 bgcolor=#E9E9E9
| 462323 ||  || — || April 7, 2008 || Kitt Peak || Spacewatch || — || align=right | 1.3 km || 
|-id=324 bgcolor=#E9E9E9
| 462324 ||  || — || April 29, 2008 || Kitt Peak || Spacewatch || BRG || align=right | 1.2 km || 
|-id=325 bgcolor=#E9E9E9
| 462325 ||  || — || April 6, 2008 || Kitt Peak || Spacewatch || — || align=right data-sort-value="0.95" | 950 m || 
|-id=326 bgcolor=#E9E9E9
| 462326 ||  || — || April 6, 2008 || Mount Lemmon || Mount Lemmon Survey || — || align=right data-sort-value="0.87" | 870 m || 
|-id=327 bgcolor=#E9E9E9
| 462327 ||  || — || October 8, 2005 || Kitt Peak || Spacewatch || (5) || align=right data-sort-value="0.76" | 760 m || 
|-id=328 bgcolor=#E9E9E9
| 462328 ||  || — || May 3, 2008 || Kitt Peak || Spacewatch || — || align=right | 2.0 km || 
|-id=329 bgcolor=#FFC2E0
| 462329 ||  || — || May 14, 2008 || Kitt Peak || Spacewatch || AMO || align=right data-sort-value="0.72" | 720 m || 
|-id=330 bgcolor=#E9E9E9
| 462330 ||  || — || April 3, 2008 || Mount Lemmon || Mount Lemmon Survey || — || align=right | 1.1 km || 
|-id=331 bgcolor=#E9E9E9
| 462331 ||  || — || May 27, 2008 || Kitt Peak || Spacewatch || — || align=right | 1.0 km || 
|-id=332 bgcolor=#E9E9E9
| 462332 ||  || — || May 28, 2008 || Kitt Peak || Spacewatch || — || align=right | 1.2 km || 
|-id=333 bgcolor=#E9E9E9
| 462333 ||  || — || April 30, 2008 || Kitt Peak || Spacewatch || EUN || align=right | 1.0 km || 
|-id=334 bgcolor=#E9E9E9
| 462334 ||  || — || May 31, 2008 || Mount Lemmon || Mount Lemmon Survey || MAR || align=right | 1.1 km || 
|-id=335 bgcolor=#E9E9E9
| 462335 ||  || — || May 15, 2008 || Mount Lemmon || Mount Lemmon Survey || EUN || align=right data-sort-value="0.96" | 960 m || 
|-id=336 bgcolor=#E9E9E9
| 462336 ||  || — || May 30, 2008 || Kitt Peak || Spacewatch || — || align=right data-sort-value="0.94" | 940 m || 
|-id=337 bgcolor=#E9E9E9
| 462337 ||  || — || May 15, 2008 || Mount Lemmon || Mount Lemmon Survey || — || align=right data-sort-value="0.92" | 920 m || 
|-id=338 bgcolor=#E9E9E9
| 462338 ||  || — || July 9, 2008 || Dauban || F. Kugel || — || align=right | 3.2 km || 
|-id=339 bgcolor=#E9E9E9
| 462339 ||  || — || July 12, 2008 || La Sagra || OAM Obs. || — || align=right | 1.6 km || 
|-id=340 bgcolor=#E9E9E9
| 462340 ||  || — || July 29, 2008 || Kitt Peak || Spacewatch || — || align=right | 1.8 km || 
|-id=341 bgcolor=#E9E9E9
| 462341 ||  || — || August 4, 2008 || La Sagra || OAM Obs. || — || align=right | 1.1 km || 
|-id=342 bgcolor=#d6d6d6
| 462342 ||  || — || March 2, 2006 || Kitt Peak || M. W. Buie || KOR || align=right | 1.3 km || 
|-id=343 bgcolor=#E9E9E9
| 462343 ||  || — || August 21, 2008 || Kitt Peak || Spacewatch || EUN || align=right | 1.3 km || 
|-id=344 bgcolor=#d6d6d6
| 462344 ||  || — || August 26, 2008 || La Sagra || OAM Obs. || TIR || align=right | 2.8 km || 
|-id=345 bgcolor=#E9E9E9
| 462345 ||  || — || August 27, 2008 || La Sagra || OAM Obs. || — || align=right | 1.3 km || 
|-id=346 bgcolor=#E9E9E9
| 462346 ||  || — || August 29, 2008 || La Sagra || OAM Obs. || ADE || align=right | 2.5 km || 
|-id=347 bgcolor=#E9E9E9
| 462347 ||  || — || August 23, 2008 || Siding Spring || SSS || — || align=right | 2.2 km || 
|-id=348 bgcolor=#E9E9E9
| 462348 ||  || — || August 26, 2008 || Socorro || LINEAR || — || align=right | 2.3 km || 
|-id=349 bgcolor=#d6d6d6
| 462349 ||  || — || September 2, 2008 || Kitt Peak || Spacewatch || — || align=right | 2.5 km || 
|-id=350 bgcolor=#d6d6d6
| 462350 ||  || — || September 2, 2008 || Kitt Peak || Spacewatch || — || align=right | 2.1 km || 
|-id=351 bgcolor=#d6d6d6
| 462351 ||  || — || September 2, 2008 || Kitt Peak || Spacewatch || — || align=right | 2.3 km || 
|-id=352 bgcolor=#d6d6d6
| 462352 ||  || — || September 2, 2008 || Kitt Peak || Spacewatch || — || align=right | 2.2 km || 
|-id=353 bgcolor=#d6d6d6
| 462353 ||  || — || September 2, 2008 || Kitt Peak || Spacewatch || EMA || align=right | 4.1 km || 
|-id=354 bgcolor=#E9E9E9
| 462354 ||  || — || September 5, 2008 || Kitt Peak || Spacewatch || — || align=right | 2.1 km || 
|-id=355 bgcolor=#d6d6d6
| 462355 ||  || — || November 26, 2003 || Kitt Peak || Spacewatch || — || align=right | 3.2 km || 
|-id=356 bgcolor=#d6d6d6
| 462356 ||  || — || September 2, 2008 || Kitt Peak || Spacewatch || — || align=right | 2.5 km || 
|-id=357 bgcolor=#d6d6d6
| 462357 ||  || — || September 2, 2008 || Kitt Peak || Spacewatch || KOR || align=right | 1.4 km || 
|-id=358 bgcolor=#d6d6d6
| 462358 ||  || — || September 5, 2008 || Kitt Peak || Spacewatch || — || align=right | 2.3 km || 
|-id=359 bgcolor=#d6d6d6
| 462359 ||  || — || September 6, 2008 || Kitt Peak || Spacewatch || — || align=right | 1.8 km || 
|-id=360 bgcolor=#d6d6d6
| 462360 ||  || — || September 4, 2003 || Kitt Peak || Spacewatch || — || align=right | 2.4 km || 
|-id=361 bgcolor=#d6d6d6
| 462361 ||  || — || September 7, 2008 || Mount Lemmon || Mount Lemmon Survey || KOR || align=right | 1.4 km || 
|-id=362 bgcolor=#E9E9E9
| 462362 ||  || — || September 6, 2008 || Mount Lemmon || Mount Lemmon Survey || — || align=right | 2.0 km || 
|-id=363 bgcolor=#d6d6d6
| 462363 ||  || — || September 7, 2008 || Mount Lemmon || Mount Lemmon Survey || — || align=right | 3.6 km || 
|-id=364 bgcolor=#d6d6d6
| 462364 ||  || — || September 5, 2008 || Kitt Peak || Spacewatch || — || align=right | 3.1 km || 
|-id=365 bgcolor=#d6d6d6
| 462365 ||  || — || September 4, 2008 || Kitt Peak || Spacewatch || EOS || align=right | 1.4 km || 
|-id=366 bgcolor=#d6d6d6
| 462366 ||  || — || September 20, 2008 || Kitt Peak || Spacewatch || THM || align=right | 2.6 km || 
|-id=367 bgcolor=#d6d6d6
| 462367 ||  || — || September 20, 2008 || Kitt Peak || Spacewatch || — || align=right | 2.5 km || 
|-id=368 bgcolor=#d6d6d6
| 462368 ||  || — || September 20, 2008 || Mount Lemmon || Mount Lemmon Survey || — || align=right | 2.7 km || 
|-id=369 bgcolor=#d6d6d6
| 462369 ||  || — || August 7, 2008 || Kitt Peak || Spacewatch || — || align=right | 2.5 km || 
|-id=370 bgcolor=#d6d6d6
| 462370 ||  || — || September 9, 2008 || Mount Lemmon || Mount Lemmon Survey || — || align=right | 2.3 km || 
|-id=371 bgcolor=#d6d6d6
| 462371 ||  || — || September 21, 2008 || Kitt Peak || Spacewatch || EOS || align=right | 2.4 km || 
|-id=372 bgcolor=#d6d6d6
| 462372 ||  || — || September 21, 2008 || Kitt Peak || Spacewatch || — || align=right | 3.0 km || 
|-id=373 bgcolor=#d6d6d6
| 462373 ||  || — || September 21, 2008 || Kitt Peak || Spacewatch || — || align=right | 2.9 km || 
|-id=374 bgcolor=#d6d6d6
| 462374 ||  || — || September 21, 2008 || Kitt Peak || Spacewatch || THM || align=right | 1.9 km || 
|-id=375 bgcolor=#E9E9E9
| 462375 ||  || — || September 22, 2008 || Mount Lemmon || Mount Lemmon Survey || JUN || align=right data-sort-value="0.85" | 850 m || 
|-id=376 bgcolor=#d6d6d6
| 462376 ||  || — || September 22, 2008 || Kitt Peak || Spacewatch || EOS || align=right | 2.3 km || 
|-id=377 bgcolor=#d6d6d6
| 462377 ||  || — || September 22, 2008 || Kitt Peak || Spacewatch || — || align=right | 3.5 km || 
|-id=378 bgcolor=#d6d6d6
| 462378 ||  || — || September 22, 2008 || Kitt Peak || Spacewatch || EOS || align=right | 1.6 km || 
|-id=379 bgcolor=#fefefe
| 462379 ||  || — || September 22, 2008 || Kitt Peak || Spacewatch || critical || align=right data-sort-value="0.52" | 520 m || 
|-id=380 bgcolor=#d6d6d6
| 462380 ||  || — || September 9, 2008 || Mount Lemmon || Mount Lemmon Survey || — || align=right | 1.9 km || 
|-id=381 bgcolor=#d6d6d6
| 462381 ||  || — || September 23, 2008 || Kitt Peak || Spacewatch || — || align=right | 2.8 km || 
|-id=382 bgcolor=#E9E9E9
| 462382 ||  || — || September 6, 2008 || Mount Lemmon || Mount Lemmon Survey || — || align=right | 3.0 km || 
|-id=383 bgcolor=#d6d6d6
| 462383 ||  || — || September 3, 2008 || Kitt Peak || Spacewatch || EOS || align=right | 1.9 km || 
|-id=384 bgcolor=#E9E9E9
| 462384 ||  || — || September 24, 2008 || Socorro || LINEAR || — || align=right | 2.1 km || 
|-id=385 bgcolor=#d6d6d6
| 462385 ||  || — || September 2, 2008 || Kitt Peak || Spacewatch || — || align=right | 2.6 km || 
|-id=386 bgcolor=#d6d6d6
| 462386 ||  || — || September 23, 2008 || Kitt Peak || Spacewatch || — || align=right | 3.5 km || 
|-id=387 bgcolor=#d6d6d6
| 462387 ||  || — || September 23, 2008 || Kitt Peak || Spacewatch || — || align=right | 3.2 km || 
|-id=388 bgcolor=#d6d6d6
| 462388 ||  || — || September 24, 2008 || Kitt Peak || Spacewatch || — || align=right | 2.4 km || 
|-id=389 bgcolor=#d6d6d6
| 462389 ||  || — || September 25, 2008 || Kitt Peak || Spacewatch || — || align=right | 2.2 km || 
|-id=390 bgcolor=#d6d6d6
| 462390 ||  || — || September 25, 2008 || Kitt Peak || Spacewatch || — || align=right | 2.2 km || 
|-id=391 bgcolor=#d6d6d6
| 462391 ||  || — || September 25, 2008 || Kitt Peak || Spacewatch || EOS || align=right | 1.7 km || 
|-id=392 bgcolor=#E9E9E9
| 462392 ||  || — || September 27, 2008 || Catalina || CSS || — || align=right | 2.8 km || 
|-id=393 bgcolor=#d6d6d6
| 462393 ||  || — || September 3, 2008 || Kitt Peak || Spacewatch || — || align=right | 2.0 km || 
|-id=394 bgcolor=#d6d6d6
| 462394 ||  || — || September 3, 2008 || Kitt Peak || Spacewatch || — || align=right | 2.6 km || 
|-id=395 bgcolor=#d6d6d6
| 462395 ||  || — || September 26, 2008 || Kitt Peak || Spacewatch || HYG || align=right | 2.3 km || 
|-id=396 bgcolor=#d6d6d6
| 462396 ||  || — || September 26, 2008 || Kitt Peak || Spacewatch || Tj (2.99) || align=right | 5.0 km || 
|-id=397 bgcolor=#d6d6d6
| 462397 ||  || — || September 5, 2008 || Kitt Peak || Spacewatch || — || align=right | 2.6 km || 
|-id=398 bgcolor=#d6d6d6
| 462398 ||  || — || September 28, 2008 || Mount Lemmon || Mount Lemmon Survey || — || align=right | 2.9 km || 
|-id=399 bgcolor=#d6d6d6
| 462399 ||  || — || September 29, 2008 || Kitt Peak || Spacewatch || Tj (2.99) || align=right | 3.5 km || 
|-id=400 bgcolor=#d6d6d6
| 462400 ||  || — || September 24, 2008 || Kitt Peak || Spacewatch || — || align=right | 2.1 km || 
|}

462401–462500 

|-bgcolor=#d6d6d6
| 462401 ||  || — || September 24, 2008 || Mount Lemmon || Mount Lemmon Survey || — || align=right | 4.0 km || 
|-id=402 bgcolor=#d6d6d6
| 462402 ||  || — || September 23, 2008 || Kitt Peak || Spacewatch || — || align=right | 3.4 km || 
|-id=403 bgcolor=#d6d6d6
| 462403 ||  || — || September 25, 2008 || Kitt Peak || Spacewatch || — || align=right | 2.9 km || 
|-id=404 bgcolor=#d6d6d6
| 462404 ||  || — || September 25, 2008 || Kitt Peak || Spacewatch || — || align=right | 2.2 km || 
|-id=405 bgcolor=#d6d6d6
| 462405 ||  || — || September 22, 2008 || Catalina || CSS || — || align=right | 3.9 km || 
|-id=406 bgcolor=#d6d6d6
| 462406 ||  || — || September 29, 2008 || Catalina || CSS || — || align=right | 2.9 km || 
|-id=407 bgcolor=#d6d6d6
| 462407 ||  || — || September 21, 2008 || Mount Lemmon || Mount Lemmon Survey || — || align=right | 3.1 km || 
|-id=408 bgcolor=#d6d6d6
| 462408 ||  || — || September 23, 2008 || Kitt Peak || Spacewatch || — || align=right | 2.8 km || 
|-id=409 bgcolor=#d6d6d6
| 462409 ||  || — || September 24, 2008 || Mount Lemmon || Mount Lemmon Survey || VER || align=right | 3.1 km || 
|-id=410 bgcolor=#d6d6d6
| 462410 ||  || — || September 28, 2008 || Mount Lemmon || Mount Lemmon Survey || — || align=right | 3.9 km || 
|-id=411 bgcolor=#d6d6d6
| 462411 ||  || — || October 1, 2008 || La Sagra || OAM Obs. || — || align=right | 2.2 km || 
|-id=412 bgcolor=#d6d6d6
| 462412 ||  || — || October 1, 2008 || La Sagra || OAM Obs. || EOS || align=right | 1.7 km || 
|-id=413 bgcolor=#E9E9E9
| 462413 ||  || — || October 1, 2008 || La Sagra || OAM Obs. || — || align=right | 3.0 km || 
|-id=414 bgcolor=#d6d6d6
| 462414 ||  || — || September 3, 2008 || Kitt Peak || Spacewatch || — || align=right | 2.6 km || 
|-id=415 bgcolor=#d6d6d6
| 462415 ||  || — || September 10, 2008 || Kitt Peak || Spacewatch || — || align=right | 2.4 km || 
|-id=416 bgcolor=#d6d6d6
| 462416 ||  || — || September 5, 2008 || Kitt Peak || Spacewatch || — || align=right | 2.7 km || 
|-id=417 bgcolor=#d6d6d6
| 462417 ||  || — || September 22, 2008 || Mount Lemmon || Mount Lemmon Survey || — || align=right | 2.7 km || 
|-id=418 bgcolor=#d6d6d6
| 462418 ||  || — || September 20, 2008 || Kitt Peak || Spacewatch || — || align=right | 2.9 km || 
|-id=419 bgcolor=#d6d6d6
| 462419 ||  || — || August 24, 2008 || Kitt Peak || Spacewatch || — || align=right | 2.7 km || 
|-id=420 bgcolor=#d6d6d6
| 462420 ||  || — || September 22, 2008 || Mount Lemmon || Mount Lemmon Survey || — || align=right | 2.3 km || 
|-id=421 bgcolor=#d6d6d6
| 462421 ||  || — || October 2, 2008 || Kitt Peak || Spacewatch || — || align=right | 3.3 km || 
|-id=422 bgcolor=#d6d6d6
| 462422 ||  || — || October 3, 2008 || Kitt Peak || Spacewatch || LIX || align=right | 2.7 km || 
|-id=423 bgcolor=#d6d6d6
| 462423 ||  || — || September 4, 2008 || Kitt Peak || Spacewatch || — || align=right | 2.9 km || 
|-id=424 bgcolor=#d6d6d6
| 462424 ||  || — || September 28, 2008 || Socorro || LINEAR || — || align=right | 2.6 km || 
|-id=425 bgcolor=#d6d6d6
| 462425 ||  || — || September 26, 2008 || Kitt Peak || Spacewatch || — || align=right | 2.8 km || 
|-id=426 bgcolor=#d6d6d6
| 462426 ||  || — || September 23, 2008 || Kitt Peak || Spacewatch || — || align=right | 2.5 km || 
|-id=427 bgcolor=#E9E9E9
| 462427 ||  || — || October 8, 2008 || Mount Lemmon || Mount Lemmon Survey || — || align=right | 2.6 km || 
|-id=428 bgcolor=#d6d6d6
| 462428 ||  || — || October 8, 2008 || Mount Lemmon || Mount Lemmon Survey || — || align=right | 3.3 km || 
|-id=429 bgcolor=#d6d6d6
| 462429 ||  || — || October 8, 2008 || Mount Lemmon || Mount Lemmon Survey || — || align=right | 3.6 km || 
|-id=430 bgcolor=#d6d6d6
| 462430 ||  || — || September 22, 2008 || Kitt Peak || Spacewatch || HYG || align=right | 2.4 km || 
|-id=431 bgcolor=#d6d6d6
| 462431 ||  || — || September 22, 2008 || Kitt Peak || Spacewatch || — || align=right | 2.8 km || 
|-id=432 bgcolor=#d6d6d6
| 462432 ||  || — || October 8, 2008 || Mount Lemmon || Mount Lemmon Survey || — || align=right | 3.5 km || 
|-id=433 bgcolor=#d6d6d6
| 462433 ||  || — || October 8, 2008 || Mount Lemmon || Mount Lemmon Survey || EOS || align=right | 3.6 km || 
|-id=434 bgcolor=#d6d6d6
| 462434 ||  || — || October 1, 2008 || Catalina || CSS || — || align=right | 4.0 km || 
|-id=435 bgcolor=#d6d6d6
| 462435 ||  || — || October 6, 2008 || Mount Lemmon || Mount Lemmon Survey || — || align=right | 2.8 km || 
|-id=436 bgcolor=#d6d6d6
| 462436 ||  || — || October 8, 2008 || Kitt Peak || Spacewatch || — || align=right | 2.2 km || 
|-id=437 bgcolor=#d6d6d6
| 462437 ||  || — || October 9, 2008 || Kitt Peak || Spacewatch || — || align=right | 2.7 km || 
|-id=438 bgcolor=#d6d6d6
| 462438 ||  || — || September 1, 2008 || Siding Spring || SSS || — || align=right | 4.0 km || 
|-id=439 bgcolor=#d6d6d6
| 462439 ||  || — || October 2, 2008 || Kitt Peak || Spacewatch || — || align=right | 2.0 km || 
|-id=440 bgcolor=#d6d6d6
| 462440 ||  || — || October 10, 2008 || Mount Lemmon || Mount Lemmon Survey || TIR || align=right | 2.6 km || 
|-id=441 bgcolor=#d6d6d6
| 462441 ||  || — || September 2, 2008 || Kitt Peak || Spacewatch || — || align=right | 2.8 km || 
|-id=442 bgcolor=#d6d6d6
| 462442 ||  || — || October 21, 2008 || Kitt Peak || Spacewatch || — || align=right | 3.5 km || 
|-id=443 bgcolor=#fefefe
| 462443 ||  || — || September 9, 2008 || Mount Lemmon || Mount Lemmon Survey || — || align=right data-sort-value="0.69" | 690 m || 
|-id=444 bgcolor=#d6d6d6
| 462444 ||  || — || October 21, 2008 || Kitt Peak || Spacewatch || — || align=right | 2.2 km || 
|-id=445 bgcolor=#d6d6d6
| 462445 ||  || — || October 22, 2008 || Kitt Peak || Spacewatch || — || align=right | 3.1 km || 
|-id=446 bgcolor=#fefefe
| 462446 ||  || — || October 20, 2008 || Kitt Peak || Spacewatch || — || align=right data-sort-value="0.52" | 520 m || 
|-id=447 bgcolor=#d6d6d6
| 462447 ||  || — || September 28, 2008 || Mount Lemmon || Mount Lemmon Survey || — || align=right | 2.9 km || 
|-id=448 bgcolor=#d6d6d6
| 462448 ||  || — || October 22, 2008 || Kitt Peak || Spacewatch || — || align=right | 3.0 km || 
|-id=449 bgcolor=#d6d6d6
| 462449 ||  || — || October 22, 2008 || Kitt Peak || Spacewatch || — || align=right | 3.9 km || 
|-id=450 bgcolor=#d6d6d6
| 462450 ||  || — || October 9, 2008 || Kitt Peak || Spacewatch || — || align=right | 2.4 km || 
|-id=451 bgcolor=#d6d6d6
| 462451 ||  || — || October 22, 2008 || Kitt Peak || Spacewatch || — || align=right | 2.8 km || 
|-id=452 bgcolor=#d6d6d6
| 462452 ||  || — || October 22, 2008 || Kitt Peak || Spacewatch || — || align=right | 3.5 km || 
|-id=453 bgcolor=#d6d6d6
| 462453 ||  || — || October 22, 2008 || Kitt Peak || Spacewatch || — || align=right | 3.3 km || 
|-id=454 bgcolor=#d6d6d6
| 462454 ||  || — || September 24, 2008 || Kitt Peak || Spacewatch || — || align=right | 2.2 km || 
|-id=455 bgcolor=#d6d6d6
| 462455 ||  || — || October 23, 2008 || Kitt Peak || Spacewatch || — || align=right | 2.6 km || 
|-id=456 bgcolor=#d6d6d6
| 462456 ||  || — || September 28, 2008 || Mount Lemmon || Mount Lemmon Survey || EOS || align=right | 2.2 km || 
|-id=457 bgcolor=#d6d6d6
| 462457 ||  || — || October 23, 2008 || Kitt Peak || Spacewatch || ELF || align=right | 3.6 km || 
|-id=458 bgcolor=#d6d6d6
| 462458 ||  || — || October 23, 2008 || Kitt Peak || Spacewatch || — || align=right | 3.1 km || 
|-id=459 bgcolor=#d6d6d6
| 462459 ||  || — || October 23, 2008 || Kitt Peak || Spacewatch || — || align=right | 3.1 km || 
|-id=460 bgcolor=#d6d6d6
| 462460 ||  || — || October 3, 2008 || Mount Lemmon || Mount Lemmon Survey || — || align=right | 2.9 km || 
|-id=461 bgcolor=#fefefe
| 462461 ||  || — || September 25, 2008 || Kitt Peak || Spacewatch || — || align=right data-sort-value="0.57" | 570 m || 
|-id=462 bgcolor=#d6d6d6
| 462462 ||  || — || October 24, 2008 || Kitt Peak || Spacewatch || — || align=right | 4.5 km || 
|-id=463 bgcolor=#d6d6d6
| 462463 ||  || — || September 23, 2008 || Kitt Peak || Spacewatch || — || align=right | 2.9 km || 
|-id=464 bgcolor=#d6d6d6
| 462464 ||  || — || September 7, 2008 || Mount Lemmon || Mount Lemmon Survey || — || align=right | 2.7 km || 
|-id=465 bgcolor=#fefefe
| 462465 ||  || — || October 10, 2008 || Mount Lemmon || Mount Lemmon Survey || — || align=right data-sort-value="0.45" | 450 m || 
|-id=466 bgcolor=#d6d6d6
| 462466 ||  || — || October 24, 2008 || Mount Lemmon || Mount Lemmon Survey || EOS || align=right | 1.9 km || 
|-id=467 bgcolor=#d6d6d6
| 462467 ||  || — || September 29, 2008 || Kitt Peak || Spacewatch || — || align=right | 2.4 km || 
|-id=468 bgcolor=#d6d6d6
| 462468 ||  || — || September 23, 2008 || Kitt Peak || Spacewatch || THM || align=right | 2.0 km || 
|-id=469 bgcolor=#d6d6d6
| 462469 ||  || — || September 23, 2008 || Kitt Peak || Spacewatch || — || align=right | 2.7 km || 
|-id=470 bgcolor=#d6d6d6
| 462470 ||  || — || October 24, 2008 || Kitt Peak || Spacewatch || HYG || align=right | 3.4 km || 
|-id=471 bgcolor=#d6d6d6
| 462471 ||  || — || September 25, 2008 || Kitt Peak || Spacewatch || — || align=right | 2.1 km || 
|-id=472 bgcolor=#d6d6d6
| 462472 ||  || — || October 23, 2008 || Kitt Peak || Spacewatch || — || align=right | 2.5 km || 
|-id=473 bgcolor=#d6d6d6
| 462473 ||  || — || October 25, 2008 || Kitt Peak || Spacewatch || EOS || align=right | 1.8 km || 
|-id=474 bgcolor=#d6d6d6
| 462474 ||  || — || October 1, 2008 || Kitt Peak || Spacewatch || — || align=right | 3.5 km || 
|-id=475 bgcolor=#d6d6d6
| 462475 ||  || — || October 27, 2008 || Kitt Peak || Spacewatch || THM || align=right | 2.0 km || 
|-id=476 bgcolor=#d6d6d6
| 462476 ||  || — || October 2, 2008 || Kitt Peak || Spacewatch || — || align=right | 3.1 km || 
|-id=477 bgcolor=#d6d6d6
| 462477 ||  || — || September 25, 2008 || Kitt Peak || Spacewatch || — || align=right | 2.5 km || 
|-id=478 bgcolor=#d6d6d6
| 462478 ||  || — || October 28, 2008 || Kitt Peak || Spacewatch || — || align=right | 3.5 km || 
|-id=479 bgcolor=#d6d6d6
| 462479 ||  || — || September 29, 2008 || Kitt Peak || Spacewatch || THM || align=right | 2.6 km || 
|-id=480 bgcolor=#fefefe
| 462480 ||  || — || October 29, 2008 || Kitt Peak || Spacewatch || — || align=right data-sort-value="0.52" | 520 m || 
|-id=481 bgcolor=#d6d6d6
| 462481 ||  || — || September 28, 2008 || Mount Lemmon || Mount Lemmon Survey || — || align=right | 3.2 km || 
|-id=482 bgcolor=#d6d6d6
| 462482 ||  || — || October 29, 2008 || Kitt Peak || Spacewatch || EOS || align=right | 1.8 km || 
|-id=483 bgcolor=#d6d6d6
| 462483 ||  || — || October 29, 2008 || Kitt Peak || Spacewatch || — || align=right | 2.8 km || 
|-id=484 bgcolor=#d6d6d6
| 462484 ||  || — || September 22, 2008 || Kitt Peak || Spacewatch || — || align=right | 3.5 km || 
|-id=485 bgcolor=#d6d6d6
| 462485 ||  || — || October 21, 2008 || Mount Lemmon || Mount Lemmon Survey || — || align=right | 3.7 km || 
|-id=486 bgcolor=#d6d6d6
| 462486 ||  || — || October 25, 2008 || Kitt Peak || Spacewatch || — || align=right | 2.6 km || 
|-id=487 bgcolor=#d6d6d6
| 462487 ||  || — || October 23, 2008 || Mount Lemmon || Mount Lemmon Survey || — || align=right | 2.5 km || 
|-id=488 bgcolor=#d6d6d6
| 462488 ||  || — || October 29, 2008 || Kitt Peak || Spacewatch || — || align=right | 3.2 km || 
|-id=489 bgcolor=#d6d6d6
| 462489 ||  || — || October 25, 2008 || Catalina || CSS || — || align=right | 4.9 km || 
|-id=490 bgcolor=#fefefe
| 462490 ||  || — || October 22, 2008 || Kitt Peak || Spacewatch || — || align=right data-sort-value="0.56" | 560 m || 
|-id=491 bgcolor=#d6d6d6
| 462491 ||  || — || November 1, 2008 || Catalina || CSS || — || align=right | 3.4 km || 
|-id=492 bgcolor=#d6d6d6
| 462492 ||  || — || October 28, 2008 || Kitt Peak || Spacewatch || — || align=right | 2.8 km || 
|-id=493 bgcolor=#d6d6d6
| 462493 ||  || — || November 3, 2008 || Kitt Peak || Spacewatch || — || align=right | 2.7 km || 
|-id=494 bgcolor=#d6d6d6
| 462494 ||  || — || November 4, 2008 || Kitt Peak || Spacewatch || — || align=right | 2.8 km || 
|-id=495 bgcolor=#d6d6d6
| 462495 ||  || — || November 6, 2008 || Catalina || CSS || — || align=right | 4.7 km || 
|-id=496 bgcolor=#d6d6d6
| 462496 ||  || — || October 2, 2008 || Mount Lemmon || Mount Lemmon Survey || — || align=right | 3.4 km || 
|-id=497 bgcolor=#d6d6d6
| 462497 ||  || — || November 6, 2008 || Kitt Peak || Spacewatch || — || align=right | 2.3 km || 
|-id=498 bgcolor=#d6d6d6
| 462498 ||  || — || November 7, 2008 || Mount Lemmon || Mount Lemmon Survey || VER || align=right | 3.2 km || 
|-id=499 bgcolor=#fefefe
| 462499 ||  || — || November 1, 2008 || Mount Lemmon || Mount Lemmon Survey || — || align=right data-sort-value="0.71" | 710 m || 
|-id=500 bgcolor=#d6d6d6
| 462500 ||  || — || November 6, 2008 || Mount Lemmon || Mount Lemmon Survey || EOS || align=right | 1.8 km || 
|}

462501–462600 

|-bgcolor=#d6d6d6
| 462501 ||  || — || September 6, 2008 || Mount Lemmon || Mount Lemmon Survey || — || align=right | 2.3 km || 
|-id=502 bgcolor=#d6d6d6
| 462502 ||  || — || April 20, 2006 || Kitt Peak || Spacewatch || EOS || align=right | 1.7 km || 
|-id=503 bgcolor=#d6d6d6
| 462503 ||  || — || November 2, 2008 || Mount Lemmon || Mount Lemmon Survey || — || align=right | 4.2 km || 
|-id=504 bgcolor=#d6d6d6
| 462504 ||  || — || September 27, 2008 || Mount Lemmon || Mount Lemmon Survey || — || align=right | 2.9 km || 
|-id=505 bgcolor=#d6d6d6
| 462505 ||  || — || November 17, 2008 || Kitt Peak || Spacewatch || — || align=right | 3.3 km || 
|-id=506 bgcolor=#d6d6d6
| 462506 ||  || — || October 31, 2008 || Kitt Peak || Spacewatch || VER || align=right | 2.9 km || 
|-id=507 bgcolor=#fefefe
| 462507 ||  || — || November 20, 2008 || Kitt Peak || Spacewatch || — || align=right data-sort-value="0.67" | 670 m || 
|-id=508 bgcolor=#d6d6d6
| 462508 ||  || — || November 20, 2008 || Kitt Peak || Spacewatch || — || align=right | 2.8 km || 
|-id=509 bgcolor=#fefefe
| 462509 ||  || — || November 20, 2008 || Kitt Peak || Spacewatch || — || align=right data-sort-value="0.58" | 580 m || 
|-id=510 bgcolor=#d6d6d6
| 462510 ||  || — || November 20, 2008 || Kitt Peak || Spacewatch || — || align=right | 2.9 km || 
|-id=511 bgcolor=#d6d6d6
| 462511 ||  || — || November 24, 2008 || Dauban || F. Kugel || URS || align=right | 4.3 km || 
|-id=512 bgcolor=#d6d6d6
| 462512 ||  || — || November 3, 2008 || Catalina || CSS || — || align=right | 3.4 km || 
|-id=513 bgcolor=#d6d6d6
| 462513 ||  || — || October 23, 2008 || Mount Lemmon || Mount Lemmon Survey || URS || align=right | 3.6 km || 
|-id=514 bgcolor=#d6d6d6
| 462514 ||  || — || November 30, 2008 || Kitt Peak || Spacewatch || — || align=right | 3.5 km || 
|-id=515 bgcolor=#d6d6d6
| 462515 ||  || — || October 25, 2008 || Kitt Peak || Spacewatch || — || align=right | 3.6 km || 
|-id=516 bgcolor=#d6d6d6
| 462516 ||  || — || September 24, 2008 || Mount Lemmon || Mount Lemmon Survey || VER || align=right | 2.6 km || 
|-id=517 bgcolor=#d6d6d6
| 462517 ||  || — || October 28, 2008 || Catalina || CSS || — || align=right | 3.4 km || 
|-id=518 bgcolor=#d6d6d6
| 462518 ||  || — || September 24, 2008 || Mount Lemmon || Mount Lemmon Survey || — || align=right | 2.9 km || 
|-id=519 bgcolor=#d6d6d6
| 462519 ||  || — || October 31, 2008 || Kitt Peak || Spacewatch || — || align=right | 3.1 km || 
|-id=520 bgcolor=#d6d6d6
| 462520 ||  || — || October 27, 2008 || Kitt Peak || Spacewatch || — || align=right | 3.4 km || 
|-id=521 bgcolor=#d6d6d6
| 462521 ||  || — || December 2, 2008 || Kitt Peak || Spacewatch || — || align=right | 3.1 km || 
|-id=522 bgcolor=#d6d6d6
| 462522 ||  || — || December 4, 2008 || Mount Lemmon || Mount Lemmon Survey || — || align=right | 3.0 km || 
|-id=523 bgcolor=#d6d6d6
| 462523 ||  || — || December 29, 2008 || Mount Lemmon || Mount Lemmon Survey || Tj (2.99) || align=right | 3.1 km || 
|-id=524 bgcolor=#fefefe
| 462524 ||  || — || March 4, 2006 || Catalina || CSS || — || align=right data-sort-value="0.94" | 940 m || 
|-id=525 bgcolor=#fefefe
| 462525 ||  || — || December 29, 2008 || Kitt Peak || Spacewatch || — || align=right data-sort-value="0.61" | 610 m || 
|-id=526 bgcolor=#fefefe
| 462526 ||  || — || December 22, 2008 || Kitt Peak || Spacewatch || — || align=right data-sort-value="0.52" | 520 m || 
|-id=527 bgcolor=#fefefe
| 462527 ||  || — || December 21, 2008 || Mount Lemmon || Mount Lemmon Survey || — || align=right data-sort-value="0.69" | 690 m || 
|-id=528 bgcolor=#fefefe
| 462528 ||  || — || December 30, 2008 || Kitt Peak || Spacewatch || — || align=right data-sort-value="0.66" | 660 m || 
|-id=529 bgcolor=#fefefe
| 462529 ||  || — || December 29, 2008 || Mount Lemmon || Mount Lemmon Survey || V || align=right data-sort-value="0.52" | 520 m || 
|-id=530 bgcolor=#fefefe
| 462530 ||  || — || December 30, 2008 || Mount Lemmon || Mount Lemmon Survey || — || align=right data-sort-value="0.76" | 760 m || 
|-id=531 bgcolor=#fefefe
| 462531 ||  || — || December 22, 2008 || Kitt Peak || Spacewatch || (2076) || align=right data-sort-value="0.66" | 660 m || 
|-id=532 bgcolor=#fefefe
| 462532 ||  || — || December 22, 2008 || Mount Lemmon || Mount Lemmon Survey || — || align=right data-sort-value="0.54" | 540 m || 
|-id=533 bgcolor=#d6d6d6
| 462533 ||  || — || December 22, 2008 || Mount Lemmon || Mount Lemmon Survey || SYL7:4 || align=right | 3.4 km || 
|-id=534 bgcolor=#d6d6d6
| 462534 ||  || — || December 29, 2008 || Kitt Peak || Spacewatch || — || align=right | 2.7 km || 
|-id=535 bgcolor=#fefefe
| 462535 ||  || — || January 2, 2009 || Kitt Peak || Spacewatch || — || align=right data-sort-value="0.53" | 530 m || 
|-id=536 bgcolor=#fefefe
| 462536 ||  || — || January 16, 2009 || Kitt Peak || Spacewatch || — || align=right data-sort-value="0.77" | 770 m || 
|-id=537 bgcolor=#fefefe
| 462537 ||  || — || January 25, 2009 || Kitt Peak || Spacewatch || — || align=right data-sort-value="0.68" | 680 m || 
|-id=538 bgcolor=#fefefe
| 462538 ||  || — || January 25, 2009 || Kitt Peak || Spacewatch || — || align=right data-sort-value="0.56" | 560 m || 
|-id=539 bgcolor=#fefefe
| 462539 ||  || — || December 30, 2008 || Mount Lemmon || Mount Lemmon Survey || — || align=right data-sort-value="0.83" | 830 m || 
|-id=540 bgcolor=#fefefe
| 462540 ||  || — || January 25, 2009 || Kitt Peak || Spacewatch || — || align=right data-sort-value="0.69" | 690 m || 
|-id=541 bgcolor=#fefefe
| 462541 ||  || — || January 25, 2009 || Kitt Peak || Spacewatch || — || align=right data-sort-value="0.55" | 550 m || 
|-id=542 bgcolor=#fefefe
| 462542 ||  || — || January 15, 2009 || Kitt Peak || Spacewatch || — || align=right data-sort-value="0.76" | 760 m || 
|-id=543 bgcolor=#fefefe
| 462543 ||  || — || January 29, 2009 || Mount Lemmon || Mount Lemmon Survey || — || align=right data-sort-value="0.53" | 530 m || 
|-id=544 bgcolor=#fefefe
| 462544 ||  || — || January 30, 2009 || Kitt Peak || Spacewatch || — || align=right data-sort-value="0.63" | 630 m || 
|-id=545 bgcolor=#d6d6d6
| 462545 ||  || — || January 1, 2009 || Mount Lemmon || Mount Lemmon Survey || 7:4 || align=right | 2.9 km || 
|-id=546 bgcolor=#fefefe
| 462546 ||  || — || January 31, 2009 || Kitt Peak || Spacewatch || critical || align=right data-sort-value="0.45" | 450 m || 
|-id=547 bgcolor=#fefefe
| 462547 ||  || — || January 17, 2009 || Kitt Peak || Spacewatch || — || align=right data-sort-value="0.67" | 670 m || 
|-id=548 bgcolor=#fefefe
| 462548 ||  || — || January 25, 2009 || Kitt Peak || Spacewatch || — || align=right data-sort-value="0.57" | 570 m || 
|-id=549 bgcolor=#fefefe
| 462549 ||  || — || November 24, 2008 || Mount Lemmon || Mount Lemmon Survey || — || align=right data-sort-value="0.60" | 600 m || 
|-id=550 bgcolor=#FFC2E0
| 462550 ||  || — || February 4, 2009 || Mount Lemmon || Mount Lemmon Survey || APOPHA || align=right data-sort-value="0.43" | 430 m || 
|-id=551 bgcolor=#fefefe
| 462551 ||  || — || January 3, 2009 || Mount Lemmon || Mount Lemmon Survey || — || align=right data-sort-value="0.58" | 580 m || 
|-id=552 bgcolor=#fefefe
| 462552 ||  || — || February 3, 2009 || Mount Lemmon || Mount Lemmon Survey || V || align=right data-sort-value="0.64" | 640 m || 
|-id=553 bgcolor=#fefefe
| 462553 ||  || — || January 17, 2009 || Mount Lemmon || Mount Lemmon Survey || — || align=right data-sort-value="0.64" | 640 m || 
|-id=554 bgcolor=#fefefe
| 462554 ||  || — || February 1, 2009 || Kitt Peak || Spacewatch || NYS || align=right data-sort-value="0.57" | 570 m || 
|-id=555 bgcolor=#fefefe
| 462555 ||  || — || January 15, 2009 || Kitt Peak || Spacewatch || — || align=right data-sort-value="0.50" | 500 m || 
|-id=556 bgcolor=#fefefe
| 462556 ||  || — || November 23, 2008 || Mount Lemmon || Mount Lemmon Survey || — || align=right data-sort-value="0.57" | 570 m || 
|-id=557 bgcolor=#fefefe
| 462557 ||  || — || February 14, 2009 || Kitt Peak || Spacewatch || — || align=right data-sort-value="0.94" | 940 m || 
|-id=558 bgcolor=#fefefe
| 462558 ||  || — || February 3, 2009 || Mount Lemmon || Mount Lemmon Survey || — || align=right data-sort-value="0.77" | 770 m || 
|-id=559 bgcolor=#FFC2E0
| 462559 ||  || — || February 19, 2009 || Socorro || LINEAR || AMOcritical || align=right data-sort-value="0.31" | 310 m || 
|-id=560 bgcolor=#fefefe
| 462560 ||  || — || February 16, 2009 || Kitt Peak || Spacewatch || — || align=right data-sort-value="0.67" | 670 m || 
|-id=561 bgcolor=#fefefe
| 462561 ||  || — || February 21, 2009 || Kitt Peak || Spacewatch || (883) || align=right data-sort-value="0.74" | 740 m || 
|-id=562 bgcolor=#fefefe
| 462562 ||  || — || February 22, 2009 || Calar Alto || F. Hormuth || — || align=right data-sort-value="0.67" | 670 m || 
|-id=563 bgcolor=#fefefe
| 462563 ||  || — || February 19, 2009 || Kitt Peak || Spacewatch || — || align=right data-sort-value="0.69" | 690 m || 
|-id=564 bgcolor=#fefefe
| 462564 ||  || — || February 22, 2009 || Kitt Peak || Spacewatch || — || align=right data-sort-value="0.74" | 740 m || 
|-id=565 bgcolor=#fefefe
| 462565 ||  || — || February 4, 2009 || Mount Lemmon || Mount Lemmon Survey || — || align=right data-sort-value="0.64" | 640 m || 
|-id=566 bgcolor=#fefefe
| 462566 ||  || — || February 22, 2009 || Kitt Peak || Spacewatch || — || align=right data-sort-value="0.87" | 870 m || 
|-id=567 bgcolor=#fefefe
| 462567 ||  || — || February 3, 2009 || Kitt Peak || Spacewatch || (2076) || align=right data-sort-value="0.71" | 710 m || 
|-id=568 bgcolor=#fefefe
| 462568 ||  || — || January 1, 2009 || Kitt Peak || Spacewatch || — || align=right data-sort-value="0.54" | 540 m || 
|-id=569 bgcolor=#fefefe
| 462569 ||  || — || February 28, 2009 || Mount Lemmon || Mount Lemmon Survey || — || align=right data-sort-value="0.78" | 780 m || 
|-id=570 bgcolor=#fefefe
| 462570 ||  || — || February 26, 2009 || Kitt Peak || Spacewatch || — || align=right data-sort-value="0.69" | 690 m || 
|-id=571 bgcolor=#fefefe
| 462571 ||  || — || February 19, 2009 || Kitt Peak || Spacewatch || — || align=right data-sort-value="0.60" | 600 m || 
|-id=572 bgcolor=#fefefe
| 462572 ||  || — || February 20, 2009 || Kitt Peak || Spacewatch || — || align=right data-sort-value="0.71" | 710 m || 
|-id=573 bgcolor=#fefefe
| 462573 ||  || — || February 20, 2009 || Kitt Peak || Spacewatch || — || align=right | 1.7 km || 
|-id=574 bgcolor=#fefefe
| 462574 ||  || — || February 24, 2009 || Mount Lemmon || Mount Lemmon Survey || — || align=right data-sort-value="0.79" | 790 m || 
|-id=575 bgcolor=#fefefe
| 462575 ||  || — || February 20, 2009 || Kitt Peak || Spacewatch || — || align=right data-sort-value="0.74" | 740 m || 
|-id=576 bgcolor=#fefefe
| 462576 ||  || — || February 28, 2009 || Kitt Peak || Spacewatch || — || align=right data-sort-value="0.94" | 940 m || 
|-id=577 bgcolor=#fefefe
| 462577 ||  || — || March 5, 2009 || Cerro Burek || Alianza S4 Obs. || — || align=right data-sort-value="0.91" | 910 m || 
|-id=578 bgcolor=#fefefe
| 462578 ||  || — || March 15, 2009 || La Sagra || OAM Obs. || — || align=right data-sort-value="0.89" | 890 m || 
|-id=579 bgcolor=#fefefe
| 462579 ||  || — || March 7, 2009 || Mount Lemmon || Mount Lemmon Survey || — || align=right data-sort-value="0.69" | 690 m || 
|-id=580 bgcolor=#fefefe
| 462580 ||  || — || March 3, 2009 || Mount Lemmon || Mount Lemmon Survey || MAS || align=right data-sort-value="0.68" | 680 m || 
|-id=581 bgcolor=#fefefe
| 462581 ||  || — || March 1, 2009 || Kitt Peak || Spacewatch || — || align=right data-sort-value="0.95" | 950 m || 
|-id=582 bgcolor=#fefefe
| 462582 ||  || — || March 1, 2009 || Kitt Peak || Spacewatch || — || align=right data-sort-value="0.65" | 650 m || 
|-id=583 bgcolor=#fefefe
| 462583 ||  || — || March 3, 2009 || Kitt Peak || Spacewatch || — || align=right data-sort-value="0.75" | 750 m || 
|-id=584 bgcolor=#fefefe
| 462584 ||  || — || February 28, 2009 || Mount Lemmon || Mount Lemmon Survey || — || align=right data-sort-value="0.77" | 770 m || 
|-id=585 bgcolor=#fefefe
| 462585 ||  || — || March 24, 2009 || Mount Lemmon || Mount Lemmon Survey || — || align=right data-sort-value="0.67" | 670 m || 
|-id=586 bgcolor=#fefefe
| 462586 ||  || — || March 26, 2009 || Kitt Peak || Spacewatch || MAS || align=right data-sort-value="0.66" | 660 m || 
|-id=587 bgcolor=#fefefe
| 462587 ||  || — || March 19, 2009 || Mount Lemmon || Mount Lemmon Survey || — || align=right data-sort-value="0.68" | 680 m || 
|-id=588 bgcolor=#fefefe
| 462588 ||  || — || March 18, 2009 || Kitt Peak || Spacewatch || CLA || align=right | 1.4 km || 
|-id=589 bgcolor=#fefefe
| 462589 ||  || — || March 17, 2009 || La Sagra || OAM Obs. || — || align=right data-sort-value="0.86" | 860 m || 
|-id=590 bgcolor=#fefefe
| 462590 ||  || — || March 19, 2009 || Mount Lemmon || Mount Lemmon Survey || — || align=right data-sort-value="0.79" | 790 m || 
|-id=591 bgcolor=#fefefe
| 462591 ||  || — || April 5, 2009 || Kitt Peak || Spacewatch || — || align=right data-sort-value="0.68" | 680 m || 
|-id=592 bgcolor=#fefefe
| 462592 ||  || — || April 16, 2009 || Catalina || CSS || — || align=right data-sort-value="0.98" | 980 m || 
|-id=593 bgcolor=#fefefe
| 462593 ||  || — || October 20, 2007 || Mount Lemmon || Mount Lemmon Survey || V || align=right data-sort-value="0.74" | 740 m || 
|-id=594 bgcolor=#fefefe
| 462594 ||  || — || April 17, 2009 || Kitt Peak || Spacewatch || — || align=right data-sort-value="0.86" | 860 m || 
|-id=595 bgcolor=#fefefe
| 462595 ||  || — || April 17, 2009 || Kitt Peak || Spacewatch || — || align=right data-sort-value="0.81" | 810 m || 
|-id=596 bgcolor=#fefefe
| 462596 ||  || — || April 18, 2009 || Kitt Peak || Spacewatch || V || align=right data-sort-value="0.57" | 570 m || 
|-id=597 bgcolor=#fefefe
| 462597 ||  || — || April 18, 2009 || Kitt Peak || Spacewatch || MAS || align=right data-sort-value="0.53" | 530 m || 
|-id=598 bgcolor=#fefefe
| 462598 ||  || — || April 19, 2009 || Kitt Peak || Spacewatch || — || align=right data-sort-value="0.73" | 730 m || 
|-id=599 bgcolor=#fefefe
| 462599 ||  || — || April 18, 2009 || Kitt Peak || Spacewatch || — || align=right data-sort-value="0.62" | 620 m || 
|-id=600 bgcolor=#fefefe
| 462600 ||  || — || March 18, 2009 || Kitt Peak || Spacewatch || — || align=right data-sort-value="0.66" | 660 m || 
|}

462601–462700 

|-bgcolor=#fefefe
| 462601 ||  || — || July 25, 2006 || Mount Lemmon || Mount Lemmon Survey || — || align=right data-sort-value="0.68" | 680 m || 
|-id=602 bgcolor=#fefefe
| 462602 ||  || — || March 28, 2009 || Mount Lemmon || Mount Lemmon Survey || — || align=right data-sort-value="0.94" | 940 m || 
|-id=603 bgcolor=#fefefe
| 462603 ||  || — || March 29, 2009 || Kitt Peak || Spacewatch || — || align=right data-sort-value="0.78" | 780 m || 
|-id=604 bgcolor=#fefefe
| 462604 ||  || — || April 22, 2009 || Mount Lemmon || Mount Lemmon Survey || — || align=right data-sort-value="0.54" | 540 m || 
|-id=605 bgcolor=#fefefe
| 462605 ||  || — || March 17, 2009 || Kitt Peak || Spacewatch || — || align=right data-sort-value="0.75" | 750 m || 
|-id=606 bgcolor=#fefefe
| 462606 ||  || — || April 17, 2009 || Catalina || CSS || — || align=right data-sort-value="0.96" | 960 m || 
|-id=607 bgcolor=#fefefe
| 462607 ||  || — || April 26, 2009 || Kitt Peak || Spacewatch || — || align=right data-sort-value="0.67" | 670 m || 
|-id=608 bgcolor=#fefefe
| 462608 ||  || — || April 8, 2002 || Kitt Peak || Spacewatch || — || align=right data-sort-value="0.62" | 620 m || 
|-id=609 bgcolor=#fefefe
| 462609 ||  || — || April 29, 2009 || Cerro Burek || Alianza S4 Obs. || MAS || align=right data-sort-value="0.64" | 640 m || 
|-id=610 bgcolor=#fefefe
| 462610 ||  || — || March 3, 2005 || Catalina || CSS || ERI || align=right | 1.8 km || 
|-id=611 bgcolor=#fefefe
| 462611 ||  || — || March 1, 2009 || Mount Lemmon || Mount Lemmon Survey || V || align=right data-sort-value="0.64" | 640 m || 
|-id=612 bgcolor=#fefefe
| 462612 ||  || — || June 1, 2009 || Cerro Burek || Alianza S4 Obs. || — || align=right data-sort-value="0.79" | 790 m || 
|-id=613 bgcolor=#fefefe
| 462613 ||  || — || June 26, 2009 || La Sagra || OAM Obs. || — || align=right | 1.5 km || 
|-id=614 bgcolor=#E9E9E9
| 462614 ||  || — || July 27, 2009 || Kitt Peak || Spacewatch || (194) || align=right | 2.1 km || 
|-id=615 bgcolor=#fefefe
| 462615 ||  || — || July 27, 2009 || Kitt Peak || Spacewatch || — || align=right data-sort-value="0.88" | 880 m || 
|-id=616 bgcolor=#E9E9E9
| 462616 ||  || — || July 28, 2009 || Catalina || CSS || — || align=right | 2.5 km || 
|-id=617 bgcolor=#E9E9E9
| 462617 ||  || — || August 12, 2009 || La Sagra || OAM Obs. || ADE || align=right | 2.2 km || 
|-id=618 bgcolor=#fefefe
| 462618 ||  || — || August 15, 2009 || Kitt Peak || Spacewatch || H || align=right data-sort-value="0.64" | 640 m || 
|-id=619 bgcolor=#E9E9E9
| 462619 ||  || — || August 15, 2009 || Catalina || CSS || — || align=right | 2.0 km || 
|-id=620 bgcolor=#E9E9E9
| 462620 ||  || — || August 15, 2009 || Kitt Peak || Spacewatch || — || align=right data-sort-value="0.98" | 980 m || 
|-id=621 bgcolor=#E9E9E9
| 462621 ||  || — || August 15, 2009 || Kitt Peak || Spacewatch || — || align=right | 1.3 km || 
|-id=622 bgcolor=#E9E9E9
| 462622 ||  || — || August 16, 2009 || Kitt Peak || Spacewatch || — || align=right | 1.6 km || 
|-id=623 bgcolor=#E9E9E9
| 462623 ||  || — || July 31, 2009 || Catalina || CSS || — || align=right | 1.7 km || 
|-id=624 bgcolor=#E9E9E9
| 462624 ||  || — || August 17, 2009 || Kitt Peak || Spacewatch || — || align=right | 2.2 km || 
|-id=625 bgcolor=#fefefe
| 462625 ||  || — || August 19, 2009 || La Sagra || OAM Obs. || NYS || align=right data-sort-value="0.70" | 700 m || 
|-id=626 bgcolor=#E9E9E9
| 462626 ||  || — || August 15, 2009 || Kitt Peak || Spacewatch || — || align=right | 1.7 km || 
|-id=627 bgcolor=#E9E9E9
| 462627 ||  || — || August 21, 2009 || Needville || J. Dellinger, C. Sexton || — || align=right | 1.7 km || 
|-id=628 bgcolor=#E9E9E9
| 462628 ||  || — || August 16, 2009 || Kitt Peak || Spacewatch || — || align=right | 1.8 km || 
|-id=629 bgcolor=#E9E9E9
| 462629 ||  || — || August 18, 2009 || Kitt Peak || Spacewatch || — || align=right | 1.8 km || 
|-id=630 bgcolor=#E9E9E9
| 462630 ||  || — || August 16, 2009 || Kitt Peak || Spacewatch || — || align=right | 1.1 km || 
|-id=631 bgcolor=#fefefe
| 462631 ||  || — || September 13, 2009 || Socorro || LINEAR || H || align=right data-sort-value="0.77" | 770 m || 
|-id=632 bgcolor=#E9E9E9
| 462632 ||  || — || September 12, 2009 || Kitt Peak || Spacewatch || — || align=right | 1.8 km || 
|-id=633 bgcolor=#E9E9E9
| 462633 ||  || — || August 18, 2009 || Kitt Peak || Spacewatch || — || align=right data-sort-value="0.98" | 980 m || 
|-id=634 bgcolor=#d6d6d6
| 462634 ||  || — || September 15, 2009 || Kitt Peak || Spacewatch || — || align=right | 3.2 km || 
|-id=635 bgcolor=#E9E9E9
| 462635 ||  || — || August 29, 2009 || Kitt Peak || Spacewatch || PAD || align=right | 1.6 km || 
|-id=636 bgcolor=#E9E9E9
| 462636 ||  || — || September 14, 2009 || Socorro || LINEAR || MRX || align=right | 1.2 km || 
|-id=637 bgcolor=#E9E9E9
| 462637 ||  || — || September 16, 2009 || Kitt Peak || Spacewatch || MRX || align=right | 1.0 km || 
|-id=638 bgcolor=#E9E9E9
| 462638 ||  || — || September 16, 2009 || Kitt Peak || Spacewatch || — || align=right | 1.7 km || 
|-id=639 bgcolor=#E9E9E9
| 462639 ||  || — || September 16, 2009 || Kitt Peak || Spacewatch || (194) || align=right | 1.7 km || 
|-id=640 bgcolor=#d6d6d6
| 462640 ||  || — || September 17, 2009 || Kitt Peak || Spacewatch || — || align=right | 2.9 km || 
|-id=641 bgcolor=#E9E9E9
| 462641 ||  || — || March 20, 2007 || Mount Lemmon || Mount Lemmon Survey || AGN || align=right | 1.0 km || 
|-id=642 bgcolor=#d6d6d6
| 462642 ||  || — || September 18, 2009 || Kitt Peak || Spacewatch || — || align=right | 2.4 km || 
|-id=643 bgcolor=#E9E9E9
| 462643 ||  || — || September 18, 2009 || Kitt Peak || Spacewatch || — || align=right | 2.3 km || 
|-id=644 bgcolor=#E9E9E9
| 462644 ||  || — || September 18, 2009 || Kitt Peak || Spacewatch || — || align=right | 2.0 km || 
|-id=645 bgcolor=#E9E9E9
| 462645 ||  || — || September 18, 2009 || Kitt Peak || Spacewatch || — || align=right | 1.4 km || 
|-id=646 bgcolor=#E9E9E9
| 462646 ||  || — || September 18, 2009 || Kitt Peak || Spacewatch || AGN || align=right | 1.00 km || 
|-id=647 bgcolor=#E9E9E9
| 462647 ||  || — || March 26, 2003 || Anderson Mesa || LONEOS || — || align=right | 1.8 km || 
|-id=648 bgcolor=#E9E9E9
| 462648 ||  || — || September 21, 2009 || Kitt Peak || Spacewatch || — || align=right | 1.8 km || 
|-id=649 bgcolor=#E9E9E9
| 462649 ||  || — || March 12, 2007 || Kitt Peak || Spacewatch || HOF || align=right | 2.5 km || 
|-id=650 bgcolor=#E9E9E9
| 462650 ||  || — || September 21, 2009 || Kitt Peak || Spacewatch || — || align=right | 1.5 km || 
|-id=651 bgcolor=#E9E9E9
| 462651 ||  || — || September 24, 2009 || Kitt Peak || Spacewatch || — || align=right | 1.9 km || 
|-id=652 bgcolor=#E9E9E9
| 462652 ||  || — || October 27, 2005 || Anderson Mesa || LONEOS || — || align=right | 1.7 km || 
|-id=653 bgcolor=#E9E9E9
| 462653 ||  || — || September 18, 2009 || Catalina || CSS || — || align=right | 2.1 km || 
|-id=654 bgcolor=#d6d6d6
| 462654 ||  || — || September 22, 2009 || Kitt Peak || Spacewatch || BRA || align=right | 1.1 km || 
|-id=655 bgcolor=#E9E9E9
| 462655 ||  || — || September 17, 2009 || Kitt Peak || Spacewatch || — || align=right | 2.1 km || 
|-id=656 bgcolor=#E9E9E9
| 462656 ||  || — || September 17, 2009 || Kitt Peak || Spacewatch || EUN || align=right data-sort-value="0.94" | 940 m || 
|-id=657 bgcolor=#E9E9E9
| 462657 ||  || — || October 1, 2005 || Mount Lemmon || Mount Lemmon Survey || — || align=right | 1.4 km || 
|-id=658 bgcolor=#E9E9E9
| 462658 ||  || — || October 30, 2005 || Kitt Peak || Spacewatch || — || align=right | 2.1 km || 
|-id=659 bgcolor=#E9E9E9
| 462659 ||  || — || October 24, 2005 || Kitt Peak || Spacewatch || — || align=right | 1.9 km || 
|-id=660 bgcolor=#d6d6d6
| 462660 ||  || — || July 30, 2009 || Catalina || CSS || — || align=right | 4.3 km || 
|-id=661 bgcolor=#E9E9E9
| 462661 ||  || — || September 18, 2009 || Kitt Peak || Spacewatch || — || align=right | 1.9 km || 
|-id=662 bgcolor=#E9E9E9
| 462662 ||  || — || September 25, 2009 || Kitt Peak || Spacewatch || — || align=right | 1.2 km || 
|-id=663 bgcolor=#E9E9E9
| 462663 ||  || — || September 17, 2009 || Kitt Peak || Spacewatch || — || align=right | 1.8 km || 
|-id=664 bgcolor=#E9E9E9
| 462664 ||  || — || September 20, 2009 || Kitt Peak || Spacewatch || GEF || align=right | 1.1 km || 
|-id=665 bgcolor=#E9E9E9
| 462665 ||  || — || September 28, 2009 || Mount Lemmon || Mount Lemmon Survey || — || align=right | 1.7 km || 
|-id=666 bgcolor=#E9E9E9
| 462666 ||  || — || September 19, 2009 || Kitt Peak || Spacewatch || AGN || align=right data-sort-value="0.99" | 990 m || 
|-id=667 bgcolor=#E9E9E9
| 462667 ||  || — || October 12, 2009 || Mount Lemmon || Mount Lemmon Survey || — || align=right | 1.8 km || 
|-id=668 bgcolor=#fefefe
| 462668 ||  || — || September 18, 2009 || Catalina || CSS || H || align=right data-sort-value="0.75" | 750 m || 
|-id=669 bgcolor=#E9E9E9
| 462669 ||  || — || September 22, 2009 || Kitt Peak || Spacewatch || — || align=right | 1.7 km || 
|-id=670 bgcolor=#E9E9E9
| 462670 ||  || — || September 30, 2009 || Mount Lemmon || Mount Lemmon Survey || — || align=right | 1.5 km || 
|-id=671 bgcolor=#E9E9E9
| 462671 ||  || — || September 22, 2009 || Catalina || CSS || — || align=right | 1.8 km || 
|-id=672 bgcolor=#E9E9E9
| 462672 ||  || — || October 12, 2009 || Mount Lemmon || Mount Lemmon Survey || — || align=right | 2.6 km || 
|-id=673 bgcolor=#fefefe
| 462673 ||  || — || March 15, 2005 || Catalina || CSS || H || align=right data-sort-value="0.68" | 680 m || 
|-id=674 bgcolor=#E9E9E9
| 462674 ||  || — || October 17, 2009 || La Sagra || OAM Obs. || GEF || align=right | 1.4 km || 
|-id=675 bgcolor=#E9E9E9
| 462675 ||  || — || September 12, 2004 || Kitt Peak || Spacewatch || — || align=right | 1.8 km || 
|-id=676 bgcolor=#E9E9E9
| 462676 ||  || — || October 22, 2009 || Mount Lemmon || Mount Lemmon Survey || — || align=right | 2.0 km || 
|-id=677 bgcolor=#d6d6d6
| 462677 ||  || — || February 2, 2006 || Kitt Peak || Spacewatch || KOR || align=right | 1.2 km || 
|-id=678 bgcolor=#E9E9E9
| 462678 ||  || — || September 18, 1995 || Kitt Peak || Spacewatch ||  || align=right | 1.4 km || 
|-id=679 bgcolor=#d6d6d6
| 462679 ||  || — || October 23, 2009 || Mount Lemmon || Mount Lemmon Survey || — || align=right | 2.2 km || 
|-id=680 bgcolor=#d6d6d6
| 462680 ||  || — || October 23, 2009 || Mount Lemmon || Mount Lemmon Survey || — || align=right | 2.1 km || 
|-id=681 bgcolor=#E9E9E9
| 462681 ||  || — || October 11, 2009 || Mount Lemmon || Mount Lemmon Survey || — || align=right | 1.6 km || 
|-id=682 bgcolor=#E9E9E9
| 462682 ||  || — || October 26, 2009 || Bisei SG Center || BATTeRS || — || align=right | 2.3 km || 
|-id=683 bgcolor=#E9E9E9
| 462683 ||  || — || October 22, 2009 || Mount Lemmon || Mount Lemmon Survey || AGN || align=right | 1.1 km || 
|-id=684 bgcolor=#E9E9E9
| 462684 ||  || — || October 23, 2009 || Kitt Peak || Spacewatch || — || align=right | 1.8 km || 
|-id=685 bgcolor=#d6d6d6
| 462685 ||  || — || October 18, 2009 || Mount Lemmon || Mount Lemmon Survey || — || align=right | 1.8 km || 
|-id=686 bgcolor=#d6d6d6
| 462686 ||  || — || October 27, 2009 || Kitt Peak || Spacewatch || KOR || align=right | 1.3 km || 
|-id=687 bgcolor=#d6d6d6
| 462687 ||  || — || October 18, 2009 || Mount Lemmon || Mount Lemmon Survey || — || align=right | 2.1 km || 
|-id=688 bgcolor=#E9E9E9
| 462688 ||  || — || October 22, 2009 || Mount Lemmon || Mount Lemmon Survey || — || align=right | 3.2 km || 
|-id=689 bgcolor=#E9E9E9
| 462689 ||  || — || October 26, 2009 || Kitt Peak || Spacewatch || — || align=right | 1.8 km || 
|-id=690 bgcolor=#E9E9E9
| 462690 ||  || — || November 8, 2009 || Mount Lemmon || Mount Lemmon Survey || — || align=right | 2.8 km || 
|-id=691 bgcolor=#E9E9E9
| 462691 ||  || — || September 15, 2009 || Kitt Peak || Spacewatch || — || align=right | 1.8 km || 
|-id=692 bgcolor=#fefefe
| 462692 ||  || — || March 9, 2005 || Catalina || CSS || H || align=right data-sort-value="0.51" | 510 m || 
|-id=693 bgcolor=#E9E9E9
| 462693 ||  || — || November 10, 2009 || Mount Lemmon || Mount Lemmon Survey || HOF || align=right | 2.5 km || 
|-id=694 bgcolor=#d6d6d6
| 462694 ||  || — || October 21, 2009 || Mount Lemmon || Mount Lemmon Survey || — || align=right | 2.9 km || 
|-id=695 bgcolor=#d6d6d6
| 462695 ||  || — || November 8, 2009 || Kitt Peak || Spacewatch || — || align=right | 2.3 km || 
|-id=696 bgcolor=#E9E9E9
| 462696 ||  || — || September 20, 2009 || Kitt Peak || Spacewatch || — || align=right | 3.4 km || 
|-id=697 bgcolor=#E9E9E9
| 462697 ||  || — || November 11, 2009 || Kitt Peak || Spacewatch || GEF || align=right | 1.6 km || 
|-id=698 bgcolor=#d6d6d6
| 462698 ||  || — || September 17, 2009 || Catalina || CSS || Tj (2.99) || align=right | 5.2 km || 
|-id=699 bgcolor=#E9E9E9
| 462699 ||  || — || November 12, 2009 || Modra || Modra Obs. || — || align=right | 2.5 km || 
|-id=700 bgcolor=#d6d6d6
| 462700 ||  || — || November 10, 2009 || Kitt Peak || Spacewatch || EOS || align=right | 1.5 km || 
|}

462701–462800 

|-bgcolor=#d6d6d6
| 462701 ||  || — || October 26, 2009 || Kitt Peak || Spacewatch || — || align=right | 2.6 km || 
|-id=702 bgcolor=#E9E9E9
| 462702 ||  || — || November 11, 2009 || Kitt Peak || Spacewatch || AGN || align=right data-sort-value="0.99" | 990 m || 
|-id=703 bgcolor=#E9E9E9
| 462703 ||  || — || October 23, 2009 || Kitt Peak || Spacewatch || — || align=right | 2.1 km || 
|-id=704 bgcolor=#E9E9E9
| 462704 ||  || — || November 16, 2009 || Mount Lemmon || Mount Lemmon Survey || — || align=right | 1.7 km || 
|-id=705 bgcolor=#d6d6d6
| 462705 ||  || — || November 17, 2009 || Mount Lemmon || Mount Lemmon Survey || — || align=right | 1.8 km || 
|-id=706 bgcolor=#E9E9E9
| 462706 ||  || — || November 16, 2009 || Kitt Peak || Spacewatch || HOF || align=right | 3.0 km || 
|-id=707 bgcolor=#d6d6d6
| 462707 ||  || — || September 21, 2009 || Mount Lemmon || Mount Lemmon Survey || EOS || align=right | 1.4 km || 
|-id=708 bgcolor=#d6d6d6
| 462708 ||  || — || October 26, 2009 || Mount Lemmon || Mount Lemmon Survey || — || align=right | 3.2 km || 
|-id=709 bgcolor=#d6d6d6
| 462709 ||  || — || November 17, 2009 || Needville || C. Sexton, J. Dellinger || — || align=right | 2.9 km || 
|-id=710 bgcolor=#d6d6d6
| 462710 ||  || — || November 17, 2009 || Mount Lemmon || Mount Lemmon Survey || — || align=right | 2.7 km || 
|-id=711 bgcolor=#d6d6d6
| 462711 ||  || — || October 27, 2009 || Kitt Peak || Spacewatch || — || align=right | 1.9 km || 
|-id=712 bgcolor=#d6d6d6
| 462712 ||  || — || November 20, 2009 || Kitt Peak || Spacewatch || — || align=right | 1.8 km || 
|-id=713 bgcolor=#d6d6d6
| 462713 ||  || — || September 29, 2003 || Kitt Peak || Spacewatch || THM || align=right | 1.7 km || 
|-id=714 bgcolor=#E9E9E9
| 462714 ||  || — || February 1, 2006 || Kitt Peak || Spacewatch || — || align=right | 2.3 km || 
|-id=715 bgcolor=#d6d6d6
| 462715 ||  || — || November 26, 2009 || Mount Lemmon || Mount Lemmon Survey || — || align=right | 2.2 km || 
|-id=716 bgcolor=#d6d6d6
| 462716 ||  || — || November 10, 2009 || Kitt Peak || Spacewatch || — || align=right | 1.7 km || 
|-id=717 bgcolor=#fefefe
| 462717 ||  || — || September 25, 2009 || Catalina || CSS || H || align=right data-sort-value="0.89" | 890 m || 
|-id=718 bgcolor=#d6d6d6
| 462718 ||  || — || November 17, 2009 || Kitt Peak || Spacewatch || — || align=right | 2.5 km || 
|-id=719 bgcolor=#E9E9E9
| 462719 ||  || — || November 16, 2009 || Socorro || LINEAR || — || align=right | 2.0 km || 
|-id=720 bgcolor=#d6d6d6
| 462720 ||  || — || November 16, 2009 || Mount Lemmon || Mount Lemmon Survey || — || align=right | 3.7 km || 
|-id=721 bgcolor=#d6d6d6
| 462721 ||  || — || December 15, 2009 || Mount Lemmon || Mount Lemmon Survey || — || align=right | 3.7 km || 
|-id=722 bgcolor=#d6d6d6
| 462722 ||  || — || December 26, 2009 || Kitt Peak || Spacewatch || — || align=right | 2.3 km || 
|-id=723 bgcolor=#d6d6d6
| 462723 ||  || — || December 18, 2009 || Kitt Peak || Spacewatch || — || align=right | 2.7 km || 
|-id=724 bgcolor=#d6d6d6
| 462724 ||  || — || December 18, 2009 || Kitt Peak || Spacewatch || — || align=right | 3.2 km || 
|-id=725 bgcolor=#d6d6d6
| 462725 ||  || — || March 10, 2005 || Mount Lemmon || Mount Lemmon Survey || — || align=right | 1.8 km || 
|-id=726 bgcolor=#d6d6d6
| 462726 ||  || — || January 6, 2010 || Mount Lemmon || Mount Lemmon Survey || — || align=right | 4.4 km || 
|-id=727 bgcolor=#d6d6d6
| 462727 ||  || — || January 6, 2010 || Kitt Peak || Spacewatch || — || align=right | 2.4 km || 
|-id=728 bgcolor=#d6d6d6
| 462728 ||  || — || December 20, 2009 || Mount Lemmon || Mount Lemmon Survey || — || align=right | 3.5 km || 
|-id=729 bgcolor=#d6d6d6
| 462729 ||  || — || January 7, 2010 || Kitt Peak || Spacewatch || — || align=right | 2.8 km || 
|-id=730 bgcolor=#d6d6d6
| 462730 ||  || — || January 8, 2010 || Kitt Peak || Spacewatch || — || align=right | 2.9 km || 
|-id=731 bgcolor=#d6d6d6
| 462731 ||  || — || January 8, 2010 || Mount Lemmon || Mount Lemmon Survey || — || align=right | 2.6 km || 
|-id=732 bgcolor=#d6d6d6
| 462732 ||  || — || January 11, 2010 || Kitt Peak || Spacewatch || — || align=right | 2.7 km || 
|-id=733 bgcolor=#d6d6d6
| 462733 ||  || — || November 23, 2009 || Mount Lemmon || Mount Lemmon Survey || — || align=right | 2.7 km || 
|-id=734 bgcolor=#d6d6d6
| 462734 ||  || — || January 7, 2010 || Catalina || CSS || — || align=right | 5.7 km || 
|-id=735 bgcolor=#d6d6d6
| 462735 ||  || — || January 8, 2010 || Kitt Peak || Spacewatch || — || align=right | 3.5 km || 
|-id=736 bgcolor=#FFC2E0
| 462736 ||  || — || January 8, 2010 || WISE || WISE || APO +1km || align=right | 1.8 km || 
|-id=737 bgcolor=#d6d6d6
| 462737 ||  || — || January 20, 2010 || WISE || WISE || Tj (2.97) || align=right | 3.5 km || 
|-id=738 bgcolor=#d6d6d6
| 462738 ||  || — || January 27, 2010 || WISE || WISE || — || align=right | 5.3 km || 
|-id=739 bgcolor=#d6d6d6
| 462739 ||  || — || February 6, 2010 || Mount Lemmon || Mount Lemmon Survey || — || align=right | 3.7 km || 
|-id=740 bgcolor=#d6d6d6
| 462740 ||  || — || February 9, 2010 || Kitt Peak || Spacewatch || — || align=right | 4.7 km || 
|-id=741 bgcolor=#d6d6d6
| 462741 ||  || — || February 9, 2010 || Mount Lemmon || Mount Lemmon Survey || — || align=right | 2.1 km || 
|-id=742 bgcolor=#d6d6d6
| 462742 ||  || — || February 13, 2010 || Catalina || CSS || — || align=right | 3.2 km || 
|-id=743 bgcolor=#d6d6d6
| 462743 ||  || — || February 12, 2010 || Socorro || LINEAR || Tj (2.93) || align=right | 3.2 km || 
|-id=744 bgcolor=#d6d6d6
| 462744 ||  || — || February 10, 2010 || Kitt Peak || Spacewatch || — || align=right | 2.9 km || 
|-id=745 bgcolor=#d6d6d6
| 462745 ||  || — || February 13, 2010 || Mount Lemmon || Mount Lemmon Survey || — || align=right | 3.7 km || 
|-id=746 bgcolor=#d6d6d6
| 462746 ||  || — || February 13, 2010 || Mount Lemmon || Mount Lemmon Survey || — || align=right | 3.7 km || 
|-id=747 bgcolor=#d6d6d6
| 462747 ||  || — || February 14, 2010 || Mount Lemmon || Mount Lemmon Survey || — || align=right | 2.9 km || 
|-id=748 bgcolor=#d6d6d6
| 462748 ||  || — || February 14, 2010 || Mount Lemmon || Mount Lemmon Survey || — || align=right | 2.9 km || 
|-id=749 bgcolor=#d6d6d6
| 462749 ||  || — || January 8, 1999 || Kitt Peak || Spacewatch || — || align=right | 3.3 km || 
|-id=750 bgcolor=#d6d6d6
| 462750 ||  || — || February 9, 2010 || Kitt Peak || Spacewatch || — || align=right | 3.3 km || 
|-id=751 bgcolor=#d6d6d6
| 462751 ||  || — || February 13, 2010 || Mount Lemmon || Mount Lemmon Survey || — || align=right | 4.5 km || 
|-id=752 bgcolor=#d6d6d6
| 462752 ||  || — || February 15, 2010 || Catalina || CSS || — || align=right | 2.7 km || 
|-id=753 bgcolor=#d6d6d6
| 462753 ||  || — || February 15, 2010 || Mount Lemmon || Mount Lemmon Survey || LIX || align=right | 3.8 km || 
|-id=754 bgcolor=#d6d6d6
| 462754 ||  || — || January 11, 2010 || Kitt Peak || Spacewatch || Tj (2.99) || align=right | 3.8 km || 
|-id=755 bgcolor=#d6d6d6
| 462755 ||  || — || February 15, 2010 || Catalina || CSS || — || align=right | 3.8 km || 
|-id=756 bgcolor=#d6d6d6
| 462756 ||  || — || February 17, 2010 || Hagen Obs. || M. Klein || — || align=right | 5.0 km || 
|-id=757 bgcolor=#d6d6d6
| 462757 ||  || — || January 10, 2010 || Kitt Peak || Spacewatch || — || align=right | 4.0 km || 
|-id=758 bgcolor=#d6d6d6
| 462758 ||  || — || September 30, 2003 || Kitt Peak || Spacewatch || — || align=right | 3.7 km || 
|-id=759 bgcolor=#d6d6d6
| 462759 ||  || — || March 5, 2006 || Kitt Peak || Spacewatch || EOS || align=right | 3.0 km || 
|-id=760 bgcolor=#d6d6d6
| 462760 ||  || — || January 17, 2004 || Kitt Peak || Spacewatch || VER || align=right | 2.9 km || 
|-id=761 bgcolor=#d6d6d6
| 462761 ||  || — || February 16, 2010 || Mount Lemmon || Mount Lemmon Survey || — || align=right | 4.1 km || 
|-id=762 bgcolor=#d6d6d6
| 462762 ||  || — || February 6, 2010 || Kitt Peak || Spacewatch || — || align=right | 3.3 km || 
|-id=763 bgcolor=#d6d6d6
| 462763 ||  || — || February 6, 2010 || Kitt Peak || Spacewatch || — || align=right | 3.3 km || 
|-id=764 bgcolor=#d6d6d6
| 462764 ||  || — || February 18, 2010 || Catalina || CSS || Tj (2.99) || align=right | 4.0 km || 
|-id=765 bgcolor=#d6d6d6
| 462765 ||  || — || March 8, 2010 || Taunus || S. Karge, E. Schwab || — || align=right | 3.0 km || 
|-id=766 bgcolor=#d6d6d6
| 462766 ||  || — || January 13, 2010 || WISE || WISE || — || align=right | 4.5 km || 
|-id=767 bgcolor=#d6d6d6
| 462767 ||  || — || December 22, 2003 || Kitt Peak || Spacewatch || — || align=right | 3.0 km || 
|-id=768 bgcolor=#d6d6d6
| 462768 ||  || — || October 15, 2007 || Kitt Peak || Spacewatch || — || align=right | 2.8 km || 
|-id=769 bgcolor=#d6d6d6
| 462769 ||  || — || March 14, 2010 || Mount Lemmon || Mount Lemmon Survey || — || align=right | 4.1 km || 
|-id=770 bgcolor=#d6d6d6
| 462770 ||  || — || December 20, 2009 || Mount Lemmon || Mount Lemmon Survey || — || align=right | 3.0 km || 
|-id=771 bgcolor=#d6d6d6
| 462771 ||  || — || May 8, 2005 || Kitt Peak || Spacewatch || — || align=right | 2.9 km || 
|-id=772 bgcolor=#d6d6d6
| 462772 ||  || — || January 12, 2010 || WISE || WISE || — || align=right | 3.9 km || 
|-id=773 bgcolor=#d6d6d6
| 462773 ||  || — || March 26, 2000 || Anderson Mesa || LONEOS || Tj (2.92) || align=right | 3.1 km || 
|-id=774 bgcolor=#d6d6d6
| 462774 ||  || — || September 17, 2006 || Kitt Peak || Spacewatch || — || align=right | 2.9 km || 
|-id=775 bgcolor=#FFC2E0
| 462775 ||  || — || April 6, 2010 || Catalina || CSS || APO || align=right | 1.1 km || 
|-id=776 bgcolor=#d6d6d6
| 462776 ||  || — || October 16, 1995 || Kitt Peak || Spacewatch || — || align=right | 4.3 km || 
|-id=777 bgcolor=#d6d6d6
| 462777 ||  || — || May 13, 2005 || Mount Lemmon || Mount Lemmon Survey || THM || align=right | 2.1 km || 
|-id=778 bgcolor=#d6d6d6
| 462778 ||  || — || February 18, 2010 || Mount Lemmon || Mount Lemmon Survey || — || align=right | 2.5 km || 
|-id=779 bgcolor=#d6d6d6
| 462779 ||  || — || April 11, 2010 || Kitt Peak || Spacewatch || — || align=right | 3.1 km || 
|-id=780 bgcolor=#d6d6d6
| 462780 ||  || — || April 9, 2010 || Catalina || CSS || Tj (2.98) || align=right | 4.7 km || 
|-id=781 bgcolor=#d6d6d6
| 462781 ||  || — || January 6, 2010 || Kitt Peak || Spacewatch || — || align=right | 3.3 km || 
|-id=782 bgcolor=#d6d6d6
| 462782 ||  || — || April 4, 2010 || Palomar || PTF || — || align=right | 3.5 km || 
|-id=783 bgcolor=#d6d6d6
| 462783 ||  || — || April 7, 2010 || Mount Lemmon || Mount Lemmon Survey || — || align=right | 3.4 km || 
|-id=784 bgcolor=#d6d6d6
| 462784 ||  || — || April 17, 2005 || Kitt Peak || Spacewatch || — || align=right | 3.1 km || 
|-id=785 bgcolor=#fefefe
| 462785 ||  || — || April 8, 2010 || Kitt Peak || Spacewatch || — || align=right data-sort-value="0.59" | 590 m || 
|-id=786 bgcolor=#d6d6d6
| 462786 ||  || — || February 13, 2010 || Catalina || CSS || — || align=right | 2.3 km || 
|-id=787 bgcolor=#d6d6d6
| 462787 ||  || — || May 19, 2010 || Catalina || CSS || 7:4 || align=right | 4.0 km || 
|-id=788 bgcolor=#d6d6d6
| 462788 ||  || — || October 14, 2001 || Apache Point || SDSS || — || align=right | 3.5 km || 
|-id=789 bgcolor=#fefefe
| 462789 ||  || — || June 13, 2010 || WISE || WISE || — || align=right | 1.8 km || 
|-id=790 bgcolor=#E9E9E9
| 462790 ||  || — || June 30, 2010 || WISE || WISE || — || align=right | 1.6 km || 
|-id=791 bgcolor=#fefefe
| 462791 ||  || — || July 7, 2010 || WISE || WISE || — || align=right | 1.5 km || 
|-id=792 bgcolor=#E9E9E9
| 462792 ||  || — || July 19, 2010 || WISE || WISE || — || align=right | 2.3 km || 
|-id=793 bgcolor=#fefefe
| 462793 ||  || — || March 19, 2009 || Mount Lemmon || Mount Lemmon Survey || — || align=right | 1.8 km || 
|-id=794 bgcolor=#E9E9E9
| 462794 ||  || — || July 30, 2010 || WISE || WISE || — || align=right | 2.3 km || 
|-id=795 bgcolor=#E9E9E9
| 462795 ||  || — || July 31, 2010 || WISE || WISE || — || align=right | 2.5 km || 
|-id=796 bgcolor=#fefefe
| 462796 ||  || — || November 3, 2000 || Kitt Peak || Spacewatch || — || align=right data-sort-value="0.74" | 740 m || 
|-id=797 bgcolor=#fefefe
| 462797 ||  || — || August 4, 2010 || WISE || WISE || — || align=right | 1.7 km || 
|-id=798 bgcolor=#E9E9E9
| 462798 ||  || — || August 6, 2010 || WISE || WISE || — || align=right | 1.6 km || 
|-id=799 bgcolor=#fefefe
| 462799 ||  || — || August 9, 2010 || Socorro || LINEAR || — || align=right data-sort-value="0.70" | 700 m || 
|-id=800 bgcolor=#fefefe
| 462800 ||  || — || June 20, 2010 || Mount Lemmon || Mount Lemmon Survey || — || align=right data-sort-value="0.80" | 800 m || 
|}

462801–462900 

|-bgcolor=#FA8072
| 462801 ||  || — || August 11, 2010 || Socorro || LINEAR || — || align=right | 1.7 km || 
|-id=802 bgcolor=#FA8072
| 462802 ||  || — || August 11, 2010 || La Sagra || OAM Obs. || — || align=right data-sort-value="0.66" | 660 m || 
|-id=803 bgcolor=#fefefe
| 462803 ||  || — || August 10, 2010 || Kitt Peak || Spacewatch || — || align=right data-sort-value="0.65" | 650 m || 
|-id=804 bgcolor=#fefefe
| 462804 ||  || — || August 19, 2010 || Kitt Peak || Spacewatch || — || align=right data-sort-value="0.70" | 700 m || 
|-id=805 bgcolor=#fefefe
| 462805 ||  || — || August 16, 2010 || La Sagra || OAM Obs. || NYS || align=right data-sort-value="0.67" | 670 m || 
|-id=806 bgcolor=#fefefe
| 462806 ||  || — || September 1, 2010 || Socorro || LINEAR || — || align=right data-sort-value="0.88" | 880 m || 
|-id=807 bgcolor=#fefefe
| 462807 ||  || — || September 27, 2003 || Kitt Peak || Spacewatch || — || align=right data-sort-value="0.72" | 720 m || 
|-id=808 bgcolor=#E9E9E9
| 462808 ||  || — || November 13, 2006 || Catalina || CSS || EUN || align=right | 1.2 km || 
|-id=809 bgcolor=#fefefe
| 462809 ||  || — || September 18, 2003 || Kitt Peak || Spacewatch || — || align=right data-sort-value="0.73" | 730 m || 
|-id=810 bgcolor=#fefefe
| 462810 ||  || — || September 9, 2010 || Kitt Peak || Spacewatch || — || align=right data-sort-value="0.77" | 770 m || 
|-id=811 bgcolor=#FA8072
| 462811 ||  || — || September 10, 2010 || La Sagra || OAM Obs. || — || align=right data-sort-value="0.72" | 720 m || 
|-id=812 bgcolor=#fefefe
| 462812 ||  || — || September 20, 2003 || Kitt Peak || Spacewatch || — || align=right data-sort-value="0.64" | 640 m || 
|-id=813 bgcolor=#fefefe
| 462813 ||  || — || September 2, 2010 || Mount Lemmon || Mount Lemmon Survey || V || align=right data-sort-value="0.61" | 610 m || 
|-id=814 bgcolor=#E9E9E9
| 462814 ||  || — || September 10, 2010 || Kitt Peak || Spacewatch || — || align=right | 1.4 km || 
|-id=815 bgcolor=#E9E9E9
| 462815 ||  || — || September 10, 2010 || Kitt Peak || Spacewatch || — || align=right | 1.1 km || 
|-id=816 bgcolor=#fefefe
| 462816 ||  || — || April 19, 2006 || Kitt Peak || Spacewatch || — || align=right data-sort-value="0.65" | 650 m || 
|-id=817 bgcolor=#fefefe
| 462817 ||  || — || September 10, 2010 || Kitt Peak || Spacewatch || — || align=right data-sort-value="0.73" | 730 m || 
|-id=818 bgcolor=#fefefe
| 462818 ||  || — || September 11, 2010 || Kitt Peak || Spacewatch || V || align=right data-sort-value="0.67" | 670 m || 
|-id=819 bgcolor=#fefefe
| 462819 ||  || — || September 4, 2010 || Mount Lemmon || Mount Lemmon Survey || NYS || align=right data-sort-value="0.52" | 520 m || 
|-id=820 bgcolor=#fefefe
| 462820 ||  || — || September 16, 2003 || Kitt Peak || Spacewatch || — || align=right data-sort-value="0.70" | 700 m || 
|-id=821 bgcolor=#fefefe
| 462821 ||  || — || September 2, 2010 || Črni Vrh || Črni Vrh || — || align=right | 1.2 km || 
|-id=822 bgcolor=#fefefe
| 462822 ||  || — || March 2, 2006 || Kitt Peak || Spacewatch || critical || align=right data-sort-value="0.52" | 520 m || 
|-id=823 bgcolor=#fefefe
| 462823 ||  || — || September 16, 2010 || Kitt Peak || Spacewatch || V || align=right data-sort-value="0.53" | 530 m || 
|-id=824 bgcolor=#fefefe
| 462824 ||  || — || September 28, 2003 || Kitt Peak || Spacewatch || — || align=right data-sort-value="0.76" | 760 m || 
|-id=825 bgcolor=#fefefe
| 462825 ||  || — || January 1, 2008 || Mount Lemmon || Mount Lemmon Survey || — || align=right data-sort-value="0.80" | 800 m || 
|-id=826 bgcolor=#fefefe
| 462826 ||  || — || April 2, 2006 || Kitt Peak || Spacewatch || — || align=right data-sort-value="0.55" | 550 m || 
|-id=827 bgcolor=#fefefe
| 462827 ||  || — || October 23, 2003 || Kitt Peak || Spacewatch || — || align=right data-sort-value="0.76" | 760 m || 
|-id=828 bgcolor=#fefefe
| 462828 ||  || — || September 9, 2010 || Kitt Peak || Spacewatch || NYS || align=right data-sort-value="0.69" | 690 m || 
|-id=829 bgcolor=#fefefe
| 462829 ||  || — || September 30, 2010 || Mount Lemmon || Mount Lemmon Survey || — || align=right data-sort-value="0.75" | 750 m || 
|-id=830 bgcolor=#E9E9E9
| 462830 ||  || — || October 17, 2006 || Kitt Peak || Spacewatch || (5) || align=right data-sort-value="0.65" | 650 m || 
|-id=831 bgcolor=#fefefe
| 462831 ||  || — || October 2, 2010 || Kitt Peak || Spacewatch || — || align=right data-sort-value="0.80" | 800 m || 
|-id=832 bgcolor=#fefefe
| 462832 ||  || — || April 20, 2009 || Mount Lemmon || Mount Lemmon Survey || — || align=right data-sort-value="0.70" | 700 m || 
|-id=833 bgcolor=#fefefe
| 462833 ||  || — || September 11, 2010 || Kitt Peak || Spacewatch || — || align=right data-sort-value="0.59" | 590 m || 
|-id=834 bgcolor=#fefefe
| 462834 ||  || — || September 16, 2010 || Kitt Peak || Spacewatch || — || align=right data-sort-value="0.65" | 650 m || 
|-id=835 bgcolor=#fefefe
| 462835 ||  || — || September 16, 2010 || Kitt Peak || Spacewatch || — || align=right data-sort-value="0.61" | 610 m || 
|-id=836 bgcolor=#E9E9E9
| 462836 ||  || — || September 16, 2010 || Mount Lemmon || Mount Lemmon Survey || — || align=right | 1.6 km || 
|-id=837 bgcolor=#fefefe
| 462837 ||  || — || October 6, 1999 || Socorro || LINEAR || — || align=right data-sort-value="0.72" | 720 m || 
|-id=838 bgcolor=#fefefe
| 462838 ||  || — || November 3, 2003 || Apache Point || SDSS || — || align=right | 1.0 km || 
|-id=839 bgcolor=#E9E9E9
| 462839 ||  || — || October 20, 2006 || Mount Lemmon || Mount Lemmon Survey || (5) || align=right data-sort-value="0.70" | 700 m || 
|-id=840 bgcolor=#fefefe
| 462840 ||  || — || October 13, 2010 || Catalina || CSS || — || align=right data-sort-value="0.83" | 830 m || 
|-id=841 bgcolor=#fefefe
| 462841 ||  || — || October 7, 2010 || Catalina || CSS || — || align=right data-sort-value="0.93" | 930 m || 
|-id=842 bgcolor=#E9E9E9
| 462842 ||  || — || December 17, 2006 || Catalina || CSS || — || align=right | 1.9 km || 
|-id=843 bgcolor=#fefefe
| 462843 ||  || — || March 28, 2009 || Kitt Peak || Spacewatch || — || align=right data-sort-value="0.95" | 950 m || 
|-id=844 bgcolor=#E9E9E9
| 462844 ||  || — || November 16, 2006 || Mount Lemmon || Mount Lemmon Survey || — || align=right data-sort-value="0.75" | 750 m || 
|-id=845 bgcolor=#E9E9E9
| 462845 ||  || — || October 28, 2010 || Mount Lemmon || Mount Lemmon Survey || — || align=right | 1.6 km || 
|-id=846 bgcolor=#E9E9E9
| 462846 ||  || — || October 17, 2010 || Catalina || CSS || (1547) || align=right | 1.5 km || 
|-id=847 bgcolor=#E9E9E9
| 462847 ||  || — || November 14, 2006 || Mount Lemmon || Mount Lemmon Survey || — || align=right data-sort-value="0.97" | 970 m || 
|-id=848 bgcolor=#E9E9E9
| 462848 ||  || — || October 29, 2010 || Catalina || CSS || — || align=right | 1.4 km || 
|-id=849 bgcolor=#fefefe
| 462849 ||  || — || August 17, 2006 || Palomar || NEAT || — || align=right data-sort-value="0.92" | 920 m || 
|-id=850 bgcolor=#E9E9E9
| 462850 ||  || — || October 31, 2010 || Mount Lemmon || Mount Lemmon Survey || — || align=right | 1.3 km || 
|-id=851 bgcolor=#fefefe
| 462851 ||  || — || April 22, 2009 || Kitt Peak || Spacewatch || — || align=right data-sort-value="0.78" | 780 m || 
|-id=852 bgcolor=#E9E9E9
| 462852 ||  || — || November 23, 1997 || Kitt Peak || Spacewatch || JUN || align=right | 1.1 km || 
|-id=853 bgcolor=#E9E9E9
| 462853 ||  || — || October 30, 2010 || Kitt Peak || Spacewatch || EUN || align=right data-sort-value="0.97" | 970 m || 
|-id=854 bgcolor=#E9E9E9
| 462854 ||  || — || November 23, 2006 || Mount Lemmon || Mount Lemmon Survey || (5) || align=right data-sort-value="0.78" | 780 m || 
|-id=855 bgcolor=#E9E9E9
| 462855 ||  || — || March 21, 2004 || Kitt Peak || Spacewatch || — || align=right | 1.3 km || 
|-id=856 bgcolor=#E9E9E9
| 462856 ||  || — || July 22, 2010 || WISE || WISE || — || align=right data-sort-value="0.75" | 750 m || 
|-id=857 bgcolor=#E9E9E9
| 462857 ||  || — || October 12, 2010 || Mount Lemmon || Mount Lemmon Survey || — || align=right | 1.1 km || 
|-id=858 bgcolor=#E9E9E9
| 462858 ||  || — || October 12, 2010 || Mount Lemmon || Mount Lemmon Survey || — || align=right | 1.6 km || 
|-id=859 bgcolor=#E9E9E9
| 462859 ||  || — || October 12, 2010 || Mount Lemmon || Mount Lemmon Survey || — || align=right data-sort-value="0.74" | 740 m || 
|-id=860 bgcolor=#E9E9E9
| 462860 ||  || — || November 24, 2006 || Kitt Peak || Spacewatch || (5) || align=right data-sort-value="0.70" | 700 m || 
|-id=861 bgcolor=#E9E9E9
| 462861 ||  || — || September 3, 2010 || Mount Lemmon || Mount Lemmon Survey || — || align=right | 1.3 km || 
|-id=862 bgcolor=#E9E9E9
| 462862 ||  || — || October 12, 2010 || Mount Lemmon || Mount Lemmon Survey || — || align=right | 1.5 km || 
|-id=863 bgcolor=#E9E9E9
| 462863 ||  || — || November 1, 2006 || Mount Lemmon || Mount Lemmon Survey || (5) || align=right data-sort-value="0.61" | 610 m || 
|-id=864 bgcolor=#E9E9E9
| 462864 ||  || — || November 20, 2006 || Kitt Peak || Spacewatch || (5) || align=right data-sort-value="0.80" | 800 m || 
|-id=865 bgcolor=#E9E9E9
| 462865 ||  || — || October 14, 2010 || Mount Lemmon || Mount Lemmon Survey || — || align=right data-sort-value="0.96" | 960 m || 
|-id=866 bgcolor=#fefefe
| 462866 ||  || — || August 27, 2006 || Anderson Mesa || LONEOS || — || align=right data-sort-value="0.82" | 820 m || 
|-id=867 bgcolor=#E9E9E9
| 462867 ||  || — || November 5, 2010 || Kitt Peak || Spacewatch || — || align=right | 1.0 km || 
|-id=868 bgcolor=#E9E9E9
| 462868 ||  || — || October 29, 2010 || Kitt Peak || Spacewatch || — || align=right data-sort-value="0.84" | 840 m || 
|-id=869 bgcolor=#E9E9E9
| 462869 ||  || — || November 20, 2006 || Kitt Peak || Spacewatch || — || align=right data-sort-value="0.98" | 980 m || 
|-id=870 bgcolor=#E9E9E9
| 462870 ||  || — || November 21, 2006 || Mount Lemmon || Mount Lemmon Survey || — || align=right | 1.3 km || 
|-id=871 bgcolor=#E9E9E9
| 462871 ||  || — || October 1, 2010 || Mount Lemmon || Mount Lemmon Survey || — || align=right data-sort-value="0.80" | 800 m || 
|-id=872 bgcolor=#E9E9E9
| 462872 ||  || — || September 3, 2010 || Purple Mountain || Mount Lemmon Survey || — || align=right | 2.0 km || 
|-id=873 bgcolor=#E9E9E9
| 462873 ||  || — || November 8, 2010 || XuYi || PMO NEO || RAF || align=right data-sort-value="0.74" | 740 m || 
|-id=874 bgcolor=#E9E9E9
| 462874 ||  || — || October 28, 2010 || Mount Lemmon || Mount Lemmon Survey || — || align=right | 1.2 km || 
|-id=875 bgcolor=#E9E9E9
| 462875 ||  || — || November 18, 2006 || Kitt Peak || Spacewatch || — || align=right data-sort-value="0.89" | 890 m || 
|-id=876 bgcolor=#E9E9E9
| 462876 ||  || — || October 13, 2010 || Mount Lemmon || Mount Lemmon Survey || — || align=right data-sort-value="0.91" | 910 m || 
|-id=877 bgcolor=#E9E9E9
| 462877 ||  || — || November 1, 2010 || Kitt Peak || Spacewatch || — || align=right | 1.1 km || 
|-id=878 bgcolor=#E9E9E9
| 462878 ||  || — || September 5, 2010 || Mount Lemmon || Mount Lemmon Survey || — || align=right | 1.5 km || 
|-id=879 bgcolor=#E9E9E9
| 462879 ||  || — || October 9, 2010 || Mount Lemmon || Mount Lemmon Survey || — || align=right | 1.5 km || 
|-id=880 bgcolor=#E9E9E9
| 462880 ||  || — || November 5, 2010 || Catalina || CSS || — || align=right data-sort-value="0.89" | 890 m || 
|-id=881 bgcolor=#E9E9E9
| 462881 ||  || — || October 30, 2010 || Mount Lemmon || Mount Lemmon Survey || — || align=right | 1.3 km || 
|-id=882 bgcolor=#E9E9E9
| 462882 ||  || — || October 28, 2010 || Kitt Peak || Spacewatch || (5) || align=right data-sort-value="0.76" | 760 m || 
|-id=883 bgcolor=#E9E9E9
| 462883 ||  || — || September 30, 2010 || Mount Lemmon || Mount Lemmon Survey || — || align=right | 1.3 km || 
|-id=884 bgcolor=#E9E9E9
| 462884 ||  || — || November 13, 2006 || Kitt Peak || Spacewatch || — || align=right data-sort-value="0.74" | 740 m || 
|-id=885 bgcolor=#E9E9E9
| 462885 ||  || — || November 16, 2006 || Kitt Peak || Spacewatch || — || align=right data-sort-value="0.75" | 750 m || 
|-id=886 bgcolor=#E9E9E9
| 462886 ||  || — || October 4, 2006 || Mount Lemmon || Mount Lemmon Survey || — || align=right data-sort-value="0.77" | 770 m || 
|-id=887 bgcolor=#E9E9E9
| 462887 ||  || — || November 23, 2006 || Kitt Peak || Spacewatch || — || align=right | 1.3 km || 
|-id=888 bgcolor=#fefefe
| 462888 ||  || — || November 17, 2006 || Mount Lemmon || Mount Lemmon Survey || — || align=right | 1.3 km || 
|-id=889 bgcolor=#E9E9E9
| 462889 ||  || — || November 14, 2010 || Mount Lemmon || Mount Lemmon Survey || — || align=right | 1.4 km || 
|-id=890 bgcolor=#E9E9E9
| 462890 ||  || — || October 9, 2010 || Mount Lemmon || Mount Lemmon Survey || — || align=right | 1.4 km || 
|-id=891 bgcolor=#E9E9E9
| 462891 ||  || — || November 27, 2010 || Mount Lemmon || Mount Lemmon Survey || — || align=right data-sort-value="0.86" | 860 m || 
|-id=892 bgcolor=#E9E9E9
| 462892 ||  || — || November 2, 2010 || Kitt Peak || Spacewatch || — || align=right | 1.5 km || 
|-id=893 bgcolor=#E9E9E9
| 462893 ||  || — || December 9, 2006 || Kitt Peak || Spacewatch || — || align=right data-sort-value="0.80" | 800 m || 
|-id=894 bgcolor=#E9E9E9
| 462894 ||  || — || November 27, 2010 || Mount Lemmon || Mount Lemmon Survey || — || align=right | 1.3 km || 
|-id=895 bgcolor=#E9E9E9
| 462895 ||  || — || November 2, 2010 || Kitt Peak || Spacewatch || — || align=right | 1.2 km || 
|-id=896 bgcolor=#E9E9E9
| 462896 ||  || — || September 19, 2001 || Apache Point || SDSS || — || align=right | 2.1 km || 
|-id=897 bgcolor=#E9E9E9
| 462897 ||  || — || November 15, 2010 || Kitt Peak || Spacewatch || — || align=right data-sort-value="0.82" | 820 m || 
|-id=898 bgcolor=#E9E9E9
| 462898 ||  || — || November 12, 2010 || Mount Lemmon || Mount Lemmon Survey || — || align=right | 1.4 km || 
|-id=899 bgcolor=#E9E9E9
| 462899 ||  || — || December 6, 2010 || Mount Lemmon || Mount Lemmon Survey || (5) || align=right data-sort-value="0.81" | 810 m || 
|-id=900 bgcolor=#E9E9E9
| 462900 ||  || — || November 25, 2006 || Kitt Peak || Spacewatch || — || align=right data-sort-value="0.98" | 980 m || 
|}

462901–463000 

|-bgcolor=#E9E9E9
| 462901 ||  || — || December 12, 2006 || Kitt Peak || Spacewatch || ADE || align=right | 1.8 km || 
|-id=902 bgcolor=#E9E9E9
| 462902 ||  || — || September 5, 2000 || Apache Point || SDSS || — || align=right | 2.2 km || 
|-id=903 bgcolor=#E9E9E9
| 462903 ||  || — || December 6, 2010 || Catalina || CSS || BRG || align=right | 1.7 km || 
|-id=904 bgcolor=#E9E9E9
| 462904 ||  || — || November 25, 2006 || Kitt Peak || Spacewatch || — || align=right | 1.1 km || 
|-id=905 bgcolor=#E9E9E9
| 462905 ||  || — || March 16, 2007 || Kitt Peak || Spacewatch || AEO || align=right | 1.1 km || 
|-id=906 bgcolor=#E9E9E9
| 462906 ||  || — || March 11, 2003 || Kitt Peak || Spacewatch || — || align=right | 1.3 km || 
|-id=907 bgcolor=#E9E9E9
| 462907 ||  || — || October 29, 2010 || Mount Lemmon || Mount Lemmon Survey || — || align=right | 1.3 km || 
|-id=908 bgcolor=#E9E9E9
| 462908 ||  || — || December 2, 2010 || Mount Lemmon || Mount Lemmon Survey || — || align=right | 1.1 km || 
|-id=909 bgcolor=#E9E9E9
| 462909 ||  || — || November 8, 2010 || Kitt Peak || Spacewatch || MAR || align=right | 1.3 km || 
|-id=910 bgcolor=#E9E9E9
| 462910 ||  || — || November 17, 2006 || Mount Lemmon || Mount Lemmon Survey || — || align=right | 1.2 km || 
|-id=911 bgcolor=#E9E9E9
| 462911 ||  || — || December 29, 2010 || Catalina || CSS || — || align=right | 2.5 km || 
|-id=912 bgcolor=#E9E9E9
| 462912 ||  || — || December 3, 2010 || Kitt Peak || Spacewatch || — || align=right | 1.9 km || 
|-id=913 bgcolor=#E9E9E9
| 462913 ||  || — || November 7, 2010 || Mount Lemmon || Mount Lemmon Survey || MIS || align=right | 2.3 km || 
|-id=914 bgcolor=#E9E9E9
| 462914 ||  || — || January 5, 2011 || Catalina || CSS || — || align=right | 1.9 km || 
|-id=915 bgcolor=#E9E9E9
| 462915 ||  || — || January 28, 2007 || Kitt Peak || Spacewatch || — || align=right | 1.6 km || 
|-id=916 bgcolor=#E9E9E9
| 462916 ||  || — || February 8, 2002 || Kitt Peak || Spacewatch || — || align=right | 2.4 km || 
|-id=917 bgcolor=#E9E9E9
| 462917 ||  || — || November 11, 2010 || Mount Lemmon || Mount Lemmon Survey || — || align=right | 1.3 km || 
|-id=918 bgcolor=#d6d6d6
| 462918 ||  || — || January 14, 2011 || Kitt Peak || Spacewatch || EOS || align=right | 1.9 km || 
|-id=919 bgcolor=#d6d6d6
| 462919 ||  || — || January 9, 2006 || Kitt Peak || Spacewatch || — || align=right | 2.4 km || 
|-id=920 bgcolor=#E9E9E9
| 462920 ||  || — || March 14, 2007 || Catalina || CSS || EUN || align=right | 1.6 km || 
|-id=921 bgcolor=#E9E9E9
| 462921 ||  || — || February 6, 2002 || Palomar || NEAT || — || align=right | 2.2 km || 
|-id=922 bgcolor=#E9E9E9
| 462922 ||  || — || October 23, 2005 || Catalina || CSS || — || align=right | 1.9 km || 
|-id=923 bgcolor=#E9E9E9
| 462923 ||  || — || January 16, 2011 || Mount Lemmon || Mount Lemmon Survey || — || align=right | 1.9 km || 
|-id=924 bgcolor=#E9E9E9
| 462924 ||  || — || January 8, 2011 || Mount Lemmon || Mount Lemmon Survey || — || align=right | 2.5 km || 
|-id=925 bgcolor=#E9E9E9
| 462925 ||  || — || May 8, 2002 || Socorro || LINEAR || — || align=right | 3.4 km || 
|-id=926 bgcolor=#E9E9E9
| 462926 ||  || — || January 13, 2011 || Catalina || CSS || — || align=right | 1.8 km || 
|-id=927 bgcolor=#E9E9E9
| 462927 ||  || — || November 20, 2000 || Apache Point || SDSS || — || align=right | 2.1 km || 
|-id=928 bgcolor=#E9E9E9
| 462928 ||  || — || January 8, 2011 || Mount Lemmon || Mount Lemmon Survey || — || align=right | 2.7 km || 
|-id=929 bgcolor=#E9E9E9
| 462929 ||  || — || December 11, 2010 || Kitt Peak || Spacewatch || — || align=right | 2.1 km || 
|-id=930 bgcolor=#E9E9E9
| 462930 ||  || — || December 8, 2010 || Mount Lemmon || Mount Lemmon Survey || — || align=right | 2.5 km || 
|-id=931 bgcolor=#d6d6d6
| 462931 ||  || — || January 16, 2010 || WISE || WISE || — || align=right | 3.3 km || 
|-id=932 bgcolor=#d6d6d6
| 462932 ||  || — || January 7, 2006 || Kitt Peak || Spacewatch || — || align=right | 2.5 km || 
|-id=933 bgcolor=#E9E9E9
| 462933 ||  || — || December 13, 2010 || Mount Lemmon || Mount Lemmon Survey || — || align=right | 2.1 km || 
|-id=934 bgcolor=#E9E9E9
| 462934 ||  || — || January 13, 2002 || Socorro || LINEAR || — || align=right | 2.1 km || 
|-id=935 bgcolor=#E9E9E9
| 462935 ||  || — || May 11, 2007 || Kitt Peak || Spacewatch || — || align=right | 2.0 km || 
|-id=936 bgcolor=#E9E9E9
| 462936 ||  || — || December 19, 2001 || Palomar || NEAT || — || align=right | 1.6 km || 
|-id=937 bgcolor=#E9E9E9
| 462937 ||  || — || January 27, 2011 || Mount Lemmon || Mount Lemmon Survey || — || align=right | 1.7 km || 
|-id=938 bgcolor=#E9E9E9
| 462938 ||  || — || March 27, 2003 || Kitt Peak || Spacewatch || — || align=right | 1.3 km || 
|-id=939 bgcolor=#E9E9E9
| 462939 ||  || — || October 25, 2009 || Kitt Peak || Spacewatch || AGNcritical || align=right data-sort-value="0.99" | 990 m || 
|-id=940 bgcolor=#E9E9E9
| 462940 ||  || — || October 30, 2005 || Catalina || CSS || JUN || align=right | 1.2 km || 
|-id=941 bgcolor=#E9E9E9
| 462941 ||  || — || January 17, 2010 || WISE || WISE || — || align=right | 1.5 km || 
|-id=942 bgcolor=#E9E9E9
| 462942 ||  || — || December 5, 2010 || Mount Lemmon || Mount Lemmon Survey || — || align=right | 1.7 km || 
|-id=943 bgcolor=#E9E9E9
| 462943 ||  || — || September 7, 2004 || Kitt Peak || Spacewatch || — || align=right | 1.6 km || 
|-id=944 bgcolor=#E9E9E9
| 462944 ||  || — || December 25, 2005 || Kitt Peak || Spacewatch || HOF || align=right | 2.1 km || 
|-id=945 bgcolor=#E9E9E9
| 462945 ||  || — || December 9, 2010 || Mount Lemmon || Mount Lemmon Survey || — || align=right | 2.4 km || 
|-id=946 bgcolor=#E9E9E9
| 462946 ||  || — || September 15, 2009 || Kitt Peak || Spacewatch || — || align=right | 1.6 km || 
|-id=947 bgcolor=#E9E9E9
| 462947 ||  || — || February 10, 2002 || Socorro || LINEAR || — || align=right | 2.0 km || 
|-id=948 bgcolor=#E9E9E9
| 462948 ||  || — || March 16, 2007 || Mount Lemmon || Mount Lemmon Survey || — || align=right | 1.3 km || 
|-id=949 bgcolor=#E9E9E9
| 462949 ||  || — || November 25, 2005 || Mount Lemmon || Mount Lemmon Survey || — || align=right | 1.6 km || 
|-id=950 bgcolor=#E9E9E9
| 462950 ||  || — || May 22, 2003 || Kitt Peak || Spacewatch || — || align=right | 1.9 km || 
|-id=951 bgcolor=#d6d6d6
| 462951 ||  || — || January 12, 2011 || Mount Lemmon || Mount Lemmon Survey || KOR || align=right | 1.1 km || 
|-id=952 bgcolor=#d6d6d6
| 462952 ||  || — || January 30, 2011 || Mount Lemmon || Mount Lemmon Survey || KOR || align=right | 1.2 km || 
|-id=953 bgcolor=#E9E9E9
| 462953 ||  || — || October 24, 2009 || Kitt Peak || Spacewatch || — || align=right | 1.8 km || 
|-id=954 bgcolor=#E9E9E9
| 462954 ||  || — || January 27, 2011 || Kitt Peak || Spacewatch || — || align=right | 2.2 km || 
|-id=955 bgcolor=#d6d6d6
| 462955 ||  || — || September 7, 2008 || Mount Lemmon || Mount Lemmon Survey || — || align=right | 2.7 km || 
|-id=956 bgcolor=#E9E9E9
| 462956 ||  || — || October 26, 2009 || Mount Lemmon || Mount Lemmon Survey || — || align=right | 1.8 km || 
|-id=957 bgcolor=#E9E9E9
| 462957 ||  || — || April 14, 2007 || Mount Lemmon || Mount Lemmon Survey || — || align=right | 1.9 km || 
|-id=958 bgcolor=#d6d6d6
| 462958 ||  || — || July 29, 2008 || Mount Lemmon || Mount Lemmon Survey || EOS || align=right | 1.9 km || 
|-id=959 bgcolor=#FFC2E0
| 462959 ||  || — || February 22, 2011 || Kitt Peak || Spacewatch || APOPHA || align=right data-sort-value="0.22" | 220 m || 
|-id=960 bgcolor=#E9E9E9
| 462960 ||  || — || January 8, 2011 || Mount Lemmon || Mount Lemmon Survey || — || align=right | 2.2 km || 
|-id=961 bgcolor=#E9E9E9
| 462961 ||  || — || October 22, 2009 || Mount Lemmon || Mount Lemmon Survey || — || align=right | 2.9 km || 
|-id=962 bgcolor=#d6d6d6
| 462962 ||  || — || August 16, 2001 || Palomar || NEAT || — || align=right | 4.0 km || 
|-id=963 bgcolor=#d6d6d6
| 462963 ||  || — || February 4, 2006 || Kitt Peak || Spacewatch || — || align=right | 2.6 km || 
|-id=964 bgcolor=#d6d6d6
| 462964 ||  || — || January 6, 2006 || Catalina || CSS || — || align=right | 2.6 km || 
|-id=965 bgcolor=#d6d6d6
| 462965 ||  || — || March 4, 2006 || Mount Lemmon || Mount Lemmon Survey || — || align=right | 2.3 km || 
|-id=966 bgcolor=#d6d6d6
| 462966 ||  || — || March 5, 2011 || Kitt Peak || Spacewatch || — || align=right | 2.5 km || 
|-id=967 bgcolor=#d6d6d6
| 462967 ||  || — || February 23, 2011 || Kitt Peak || Spacewatch || — || align=right | 2.2 km || 
|-id=968 bgcolor=#d6d6d6
| 462968 ||  || — || February 24, 2006 || Palomar || NEAT || — || align=right | 2.5 km || 
|-id=969 bgcolor=#d6d6d6
| 462969 ||  || — || March 12, 2010 || WISE || WISE || — || align=right | 2.3 km || 
|-id=970 bgcolor=#d6d6d6
| 462970 ||  || — || September 30, 2007 || Kitt Peak || Spacewatch || — || align=right | 3.6 km || 
|-id=971 bgcolor=#d6d6d6
| 462971 ||  || — || November 26, 2003 || Kitt Peak || Spacewatch || — || align=right | 3.4 km || 
|-id=972 bgcolor=#d6d6d6
| 462972 ||  || — || September 20, 2003 || Palomar || NEAT || — || align=right | 3.1 km || 
|-id=973 bgcolor=#d6d6d6
| 462973 ||  || — || March 12, 2011 || Mount Lemmon || Mount Lemmon Survey || — || align=right | 2.6 km || 
|-id=974 bgcolor=#d6d6d6
| 462974 ||  || — || September 27, 2003 || Kitt Peak || Spacewatch || KOR || align=right | 1.2 km || 
|-id=975 bgcolor=#d6d6d6
| 462975 ||  || — || January 28, 2000 || Kitt Peak || Spacewatch || — || align=right | 2.3 km || 
|-id=976 bgcolor=#d6d6d6
| 462976 ||  || — || March 10, 2011 || Kitt Peak || Spacewatch || — || align=right | 2.9 km || 
|-id=977 bgcolor=#d6d6d6
| 462977 ||  || — || January 28, 2000 || Kitt Peak || Spacewatch || — || align=right | 2.2 km || 
|-id=978 bgcolor=#d6d6d6
| 462978 ||  || — || April 4, 2010 || WISE || WISE || — || align=right | 4.0 km || 
|-id=979 bgcolor=#d6d6d6
| 462979 ||  || — || March 14, 2011 || Mount Lemmon || Mount Lemmon Survey || — || align=right | 2.3 km || 
|-id=980 bgcolor=#d6d6d6
| 462980 ||  || — || September 3, 2008 || Kitt Peak || Spacewatch || — || align=right | 2.1 km || 
|-id=981 bgcolor=#d6d6d6
| 462981 ||  || — || February 4, 2006 || Kitt Peak || Spacewatch || — || align=right | 3.1 km || 
|-id=982 bgcolor=#E9E9E9
| 462982 ||  || — || October 7, 2004 || Kitt Peak || Spacewatch || MRX || align=right | 1.0 km || 
|-id=983 bgcolor=#d6d6d6
| 462983 ||  || — || December 16, 2004 || Kitt Peak || Spacewatch || EOS || align=right | 1.9 km || 
|-id=984 bgcolor=#d6d6d6
| 462984 ||  || — || February 9, 2006 || Palomar || NEAT || BRA || align=right | 1.9 km || 
|-id=985 bgcolor=#d6d6d6
| 462985 ||  || — || September 26, 2008 || Kitt Peak || Spacewatch || EOS || align=right | 1.7 km || 
|-id=986 bgcolor=#d6d6d6
| 462986 ||  || — || March 26, 2011 || Kitt Peak || Spacewatch || THM || align=right | 1.9 km || 
|-id=987 bgcolor=#d6d6d6
| 462987 ||  || — || September 10, 2007 || Kitt Peak || Spacewatch || — || align=right | 3.1 km || 
|-id=988 bgcolor=#d6d6d6
| 462988 ||  || — || March 14, 2011 || Catalina || CSS || — || align=right | 3.4 km || 
|-id=989 bgcolor=#d6d6d6
| 462989 ||  || — || October 25, 2008 || Kitt Peak || Spacewatch || EOS || align=right | 2.2 km || 
|-id=990 bgcolor=#d6d6d6
| 462990 ||  || — || March 28, 2011 || Mount Lemmon || Mount Lemmon Survey || — || align=right | 2.9 km || 
|-id=991 bgcolor=#d6d6d6
| 462991 ||  || — || March 26, 2011 || Mount Lemmon || Mount Lemmon Survey || — || align=right | 3.3 km || 
|-id=992 bgcolor=#d6d6d6
| 462992 ||  || — || March 26, 2011 || Mount Lemmon || Mount Lemmon Survey || — || align=right | 3.4 km || 
|-id=993 bgcolor=#d6d6d6
| 462993 ||  || — || April 19, 2006 || Kitt Peak || Spacewatch || — || align=right | 1.9 km || 
|-id=994 bgcolor=#fefefe
| 462994 ||  || — || March 29, 2011 || Kitt Peak || Spacewatch || H || align=right data-sort-value="0.55" | 550 m || 
|-id=995 bgcolor=#d6d6d6
| 462995 ||  || — || March 27, 2011 || Mount Lemmon || Mount Lemmon Survey || — || align=right | 2.2 km || 
|-id=996 bgcolor=#E9E9E9
| 462996 ||  || — || September 4, 2008 || Kitt Peak || Spacewatch || — || align=right | 2.2 km || 
|-id=997 bgcolor=#d6d6d6
| 462997 ||  || — || April 26, 2006 || Kitt Peak || Spacewatch || THM || align=right | 2.2 km || 
|-id=998 bgcolor=#d6d6d6
| 462998 ||  || — || February 10, 2011 || Mount Lemmon || Mount Lemmon Survey || — || align=right | 2.3 km || 
|-id=999 bgcolor=#E9E9E9
| 462999 ||  || — || January 27, 2006 || Mount Lemmon || Mount Lemmon Survey || — || align=right | 2.3 km || 
|-id=000 bgcolor=#d6d6d6
| 463000 ||  || — || December 10, 2004 || Kitt Peak || Spacewatch || — || align=right | 3.2 km || 
|}

References

External links 
 Discovery Circumstances: Numbered Minor Planets (460001)–(465000) (IAU Minor Planet Center)

0462